This article lists compositions written for the viola.  The list includes works in which the viola is a featured instrument: viola solo, viola and piano, viola and orchestra, ensemble of violas, etc.  Catalogue number, date of composition and publisher (for copyrighted works) are also included.  Ordering is by composer surname.

This pages lists composers whose surname falls into the T to Z alphabetic range.  For others, see respective pages:
 List of compositions for viola: A to B
 List of compositions for viola: C to E
 List of compositions for viola: F to H
 List of compositions for viola: I to K
 List of compositions for viola: L to N
 List of compositions for viola: O to R
 List of compositions for viola: S

T
 Emil Tabakov (b. 1947)
     Concerto for violа and orchestra (2006)
     Sonata for viola and double bass (2005); Musica Publishing House, Sofia
     Sonata for viola and trombone
 Dobrinka Tabakova (b. 1980)
     Concerto for viola and string orchestra (2004); Valonius Press
     Pirin for viola solo (2000); Valonius Press
     Suite in Jazz Style for viola and piano (2008); Valonius Press
     Suite in Old Style "The Court Jester Amareu" for solo viola, string ensemble and harpsichord (2006); Valonius Press
     Whispered Lullaby for viola and piano (2004); Valonius Press
 Ricardo Tacuchian (b. 1939)
     Toccata for viola and piano; Academia Brasileira de Música
     Trio das Águas for clarinet, viola and piano; Academia Brasileira de Música
     Xilogravura for viola and piano (2004); Academia Brasileira de Música
 Thomas Täglichsbeck (1799–1867)
     Concertstück (Concert Piece) in C minor for viola and piano, Op. 49 (published 1867)
 Gabrio Taglietti (b. 1955)
     Adagio (frammento) for viola and CD (1999)
     Capriccio for viola and piano (1985); Casa Ricordi
 Stefano Taglietti (b. 1965)
     Paesaggio sensibile No. 2 for flute, viola and harp (2004); Rai Trade
     Serenata del canto labile for soprano, viola and percussion (1995)
 Peter Tahourdin (1928–2009)
     Music for Solo Viola (2001); Australian Music Centre
 Yoshihisa Taira (1937–2005)
     Pénombres V for viola and piano (1996); Éditions Musicales Transatlantiques
     Sonata for viola solo
 Hiroaki Takaha – 鷹羽弘晃 (b. 1979)
     Dozenal Counting Song (12進法のかぞえうた) for viola solo (2010)
     Revolving Pieces (『回転ピース』より) for voice, koto and viola (2007)
 Tohgo Takahashi – 高橋東悟 (1961–2012)
     Position for viola and string quartet (1997)
     Reminiscences…(Fragment) (追想 …（断片）) for violin and viola (2001)
 Yūji Takahashi (b. 1938)
     Like Swans Leaving the Lake (白鳥が池を捨てるように) for viola and accordion (1995)
     Mimi no ho (耳の帆), "Sail of the Ears" for shō, viola and reciter (1994)
     Viola of Dmitri Shostakovich (ドミトリー・ショスタコーヴィチのヴィオラ) for viola solo (2002)
 Motoki Takeda – 武田モトキ (b. 1974)
     Intermittence II (アンタルミタンスII) for viola solo (2000)
     Tudor Rose (チューダーの薔薇) for viola and piano (1998)
 Tōru Takemitsu (1930–1996)
     A Bird Came Down the Walk (鳥が道に降りてきた) for viola and piano (1994); Schott Japan
     A String around Autumn (ア・ストリング・アラウンド・オータム) for viola and orchestra (1989); Schott Japan
     And Then I Knew 'Twas Wind (そして、それが風であることを知った) for flute, viola and harp (1992); Schott Japan
 Josef Tal (1910–2008)
     Concerto for viola and chamber orchestra (1954); Israel Music Institute
     Duo for viola and piano (1965); Israel Music Institute
     Perspective for viola solo (1996); Israel Music Institute
     Sonata for viola and piano (1960); Israel Music Institute
     Suite for viola solo (1940); Israel Music Institute
 Robert Talbot (1893–1954)
     Pièce for viola and piano
 Louise Talma (1906–1996)
     Seven Episodes for flute, viola and piano (1988); Henmar Press; C.F. Peters
 Andrea Talmelli (b. 1950)
     Notturno for recorder and viola (2001)
     Piccola Suite for viola and piano (1975)
 János Tamás (1936–1995) 
     Feuerbilder for clarinet, viola and piano (1986)
     Memento for alternating violin and viola with piano (1988)
     Poema for viola and string orchestra (1952–1961, 1980); original  for horn and string orchestra; Musik Verlag Nepomuk
     Spiegelungen for alternating violin and viola (1990)
     Traumquell for cello or viola and piano (1979)
 Jonas Tamulionis (b. 1949)
     Penki etiudai (Five Etudes) for violin and viola (1979)
     Symphony No. 3 for 2 violins and viola soli and orchestra (1986); Lithuanian Music Information and Publishing Centre
 Tan Chan Boon – 陈灿汶 (b. 1965)
     Adagio in Memory of My Father for viola solo, Op. 39 (2000)
     Awakening, Grand Caprice from the Opening Theme of Mahler's 10th Symphony for viola solo, Op. 12 (1990, revised 1999)
 Tan Dun (b. 1957)
     Dust in the Wind for piccolo and viola (1989)
 Yoshifumi Tanaka – 田中吉史 (b. 1968)
     bogenspiel Ib for viola solo (2004)
     Danzina per Yoriaki Matsudaira (松平頼暁のための小舞曲) for viola solo (2001)
     An Interview with L.B. Interpreted by Viola and Piano for viola and piano (2006)
     Lessico famigliare for viola, piano and tape (2000)
 Cengiz Tanç (1933–1997)
     Concerto for viola and orchestra (1986)
 Elias Tanenbaum (1924–2008)
     Back for viola and guitar (2004); American Composers Alliance
     Duo for guitar and viola (1980); American Composers Alliance
 Alexander Taneyev (1850–1918)
     Album Leaf (Листок из альбома) in G major for viola and piano, Op. 33
 Svend Erik Tanggaard (b. 1942)
     Preghiera del signore for low voice and viola (1983); Edition Samfundet
     Preghiera semplice for low voice and viola (1982–1983); Edition Samfundet
 Éric Tanguy (b. 1968)
     Rhapsodie for viola and piano (2017); Éditions Salabert
 Hilary Tann (b. 1947)
     The Cresset Stone, Meditation for solo viola (1993); Oxford University Press
     Duo for oboe and viola (1981); Oxford University Press
     From the Song of Amergin for flute, viola and harp (1995); Oxford University Press
 Theodore Xavier Tanner (c.1880–1948)
     Trio in C minor for violin, viola and piano, Op. 6 (1906)
 Alexandre Tansman (1897–1986)
     Alla Polacca for viola and piano (1987); Collection Panorama: Œuvres Contemporaines, Volume 1 (1987); Éditions Gérard Billaudot
     Concerto for viola and orchestra (1936–1937); Éditions Max Eschig; Associated Music Publishers
 Cornel Ţăranu (b. 1934)
     Kerkyra Trio for saxophone, viola and piano (2007)
     Sonata for viola solo (1990); Éditions Salabert
 Cătălin Târcolea (b. 1953)
     Terpsichore, Sonata for pan flute, viola and harp (1984)
 Boudewijn Tarenskeen (b. 1952)
     Poetry for viola solo (1993); Donemus
 Mikael Tariverdiev (1931–1996)
     Concerto in Romantic Style (Концерт в романтическом стиле) for viola and string orchestra, Op. 102 (1993)
 Donald Tarshes
     Duo for clarinet and viola (2000); Theodore Presser Company
 John Tartaglia (1932–2018)
     Capriccio for viola and double bass (or cello) (2004); Beady Eyes Publishing
     Fantasia on themes of Marin Marais for viola and double bass (1984); Liben Music Publishers; Beady Eyes Publishing
     Homage à Shostakovich for flute and viola (1980); Beady Eyes Publishing
     Inventa Diaboli for viola and cello (1990); Beady Eyes Publishing
     My Life Closed Twice for mezzo-soprano and viola (2000); words by Emily Dickinson; Beady Eyes Publishing
     Primavera for oboe and viola (1999); Beady Eyes Publishing
 Phyllis Tate (1911–1987)
     A Seasonal Sequence for viola and piano (1977); Oxford University Press
     Variegations for viola solo (1970); Oxford University Press
 Bruce J. Taub (b. 1948)
     Double Exposure for viola and cello (1994); C.F. Peters
     A Lament for viola and piano (1980)
     Sonata for solo viola (1988); C.F. Peters
 Jan Tausinger (1921–1980)
     Concertino Meditazione for viola and chamber orchestra (1965); Český Hudební Fond; Schott Music Panton
     Duetti Compatibili for soprano and viola (1971)
     Hommage à Ladislav Černý for viola and piano (1971)
     7 Michrochromophonies for clarinet, viola and piano (1977); Český Hudební Fond
     Partita for viola and piano (1954); Český Hudební Fond; Schott Music Panton
     Sonata for viola and piano; Český Hudební Fond
 Vilém Tauský (1910–2004)
     Essay for viola solo (1965); CMA Publications
 Gunther Tautenhahn (b. 1938)
     Concerto for viola and 13 instruments (1969); Seesaw Music
     Emotions of a Note No. 1 for clarinet, tom-toms and viola (1973); Seesaw Music
     Sonata No. 1 for viola and piano (1969); Seesaw Music Corporation
 Cornelia Tăutu (1938–2019)
     De Doi (The Two) for viola and cello (1994)
 Mário Tavares (1928–2003)
     Balada for viola or cello and piano (1945)
     Concerto for viola and orchestra (1987–1988)
 John Tavener (1944–2013)
     The Myrrh-Bearer for viola, chorus and percussionist (1993); Chester Novello
     Out of the Night for viola solo (1996); Chester Novello
 Francesc Taverna-Bech (1932–2010)
     Cicle for viola solo, Op. 39 (1978); Clivis Publicacions
     Climes II for viola and piano (1982); Clivis Publicacions
     Rapsodía for viola and piano (1959)
 Matthew Taylor (b. 1964)
     Concerto "Humoreskes" for viola and orchestra, Op. 41 (2010); Peters Edition
     Fantasy Pieces for cello (or viola) and piano, Op. 30 (2002); Peters Edition
     Trio "In Memoriam V. H." for flute, viola and cello, Op. 21 (1997); Peters Edition
 Zlata Tcaci (1928–2006)
     Sonata for viola and piano (1981); Sovetskii Kompozitor; Karthause-Schmülling
 Alexander Tchaikovsky – Александр Владимирович Чайковский (b. 1946)
     Chromatic Dreams (Хроматические сновидения) for viola and piano, Op. 48 (1991); Music Well
     Concerto [No. 1] for viola and orchestra, Op. 13 (1978); Sovetsky Kompozitor; Music Well
     Concerto No. 2 "Etudes in Simple Tones" (Этюды в простых тонах) for viola, orchestra, Op. 58 (1992–1993); Music Well
     Consolation (Утешение) for viola and chamber orchestra, Op. 99 (2010)
     Double Concerto "Distant Dreams of Childhood" (Далёкие сны детства) for violin, viola and orchestra, Op. 43 (1988)
     From Petrushka to Pulcinella (От Петрушки до Пульчинеллы), Concertino for viola and string orchestra, Op. 60 (1994)
     Harold in Russia (Гарольд в России), Concerto No. 3 for viola and orchestra, Op. 64 (1996)
     Mournful Pavane (Печальная павана) for 5 violas, Op. 40 (1988); Sikorski
     Sonata for viola and piano, Op. 49 No. 1 (1991); Music Well
     Symphony No. 4 for solo viola, chorus and orchestra, Op. 86 (2004)
     Thirteenth (Тринадцатый) for viola and chamber orchestra, Op. 68 (1996); transcription of String Quartet No. 13, Op. 138 by Dmitri Shostakovich
 Boris Tchaikovsky (1925–1996)
     From Kipling (Из Киплинга) for mezzo-soprano and viola (1994); Boris Tchaikovsky Society
 Pyotr Ilyich Tchaikovsky (1840–1893)
     April (The Snowdrop), Op. 37b No. 10 (1875–1876); transcription for viola and piano by Vadim Borisovsky
     Ardent Declaration (Страстное признание; Aveu Passionné); transcription for viola and piano by Vadim Borisovsky; Declaration of Love: Album of Popular Pieces for Viola and Piano (Страстное Признание: Альбом Популярных Пьес), Muzyka
     January (At the Fireside), Op. 37b No. 1 (1875–1876); transcription for viola and piano by Vadim Borisovsky
     June (Barcarolle), Op. 37b No. 6 (1875–1876); transcription for viola and piano by Lionel Tertis
     May (White Nights), Op. 37b No. 5 (1875–1876); transcription for viola and piano by Vadim Borisovsky
     Nocturne in D minor, Op. 19 No. 4 (1873); transcription for viola and piano by Vadim Borisovsky
     None But the Lonely Heart, Op. 6 No. 6 (1869); transcription for viola and piano by William Primrose (1955)
     October (Autumn Song), Op. 37b No. 10 (1875–1876); transcription for viola and piano by Vadim Borisovsky
     Valse Sentimentale, Op. 56 No. 6 (1882); transcription for viola and piano by Vadim Borisovsky
 Dimitri Tchesnokov (b. 1982)
     Élégie nocturne for viola and piano, Op. 25 (2004); Éditions Delatour
 David Tcimpidis (b. 1938)
     Sonata for viola and piano (2004)
 David Teie
     Concerto for viola, cello and orchestra (2002); Lauren Keiser Music Publishing
 Tuomo Teirilä (b. 1952)
     Variations for viola solo (1994); Edition Wilhelm Hansen
 Andy Teirstein (b. 1957)
     Accustomed to Travelling for voice and viola (2004)
     Kopanitza, Duo for violin and viola (2005); Animal Stone Productions
     Maramures, Concerto for viola and orchestra (1995, revised 2008)
     The Welcome Table for viola solo (2005)
 Georg Philipp Telemann (1681–1767)
     Concerto in G Major for viola and string orchestra, TWV 51:G9
     Concerto in G major for 2 violas and string orchestra, TWV 52:G3
     Parti Polonaise for 2 violas and bass; Gems Music Publications
 Jiří Teml (b. 1935)
     Dvě folklórní studie (2 Folklore Studies) for flute, viola and harp (1999); Český Hudební Fond
     Divertimento for violin and viola (2002)
     Komorní hudba (Chamber Music) for viola and piano (2007); Český Hudební Fond
     Monolog for viola solo (1981); Český Hudební Fond
     Meditace a rozkoše (Meditation and Delights), 2 Movements for viola and harpsichord after Jan Zrzavý (1990)
     Zelená flétna (The Green Flute), Melodrama on Verses of Miroslav Florian for reciter, flute, viola and harp (1983)
 James Tenney (1934–2006)
     Blues for Annie for viola solo (1975)
     Chorale for viola and harp (or piano) (1973)
     For Viola for viola solo (1959); Frog Peak Music
     Just a Bagatelle for viola solo (1959, 1999); Frog Peak Music
     Song'n'Dance for Harry Partch for adapted viola, diamond arimba, strings and percussion (1999); Frog Peak Music
     Spectrum 8 for solo viola and six instruments (2001); Frog Peak Music; Canadian Music Centre
     Two Koans and a Canon for viola and tape-delay system (1982)
 Livia Teodorescu-Ciocănea (b. 1959)
     Clariviola for clarinet and viola (2003)
 Rikuya Terashima – 寺嶋陸也 (b. 1964)
      Sonata for solo viola (1992); Japan Federation of Composers
 Mikhail Nikitich Terian – Михаил Никитич Тэриан (1905–1987)
     6 Etudes (Шесть этюдов) for viola, Op. 1 (1936);  (State Music Publishing House)
     Suite for viola and piano (1930)
 Daniela Terranova (b. 1977)
     Colore d'ombra for viola solo; Bèrben Edizioni Musicali
 Maria Francesca Romana Terreni (b. 1956)
     ...oltre la sua materia... for soprano, viola and guitar, Op. 83 (2002); Ut Orpheus Edizioni
 Jivan Ter-Tadevosyan – Ջիվան (Ջոն) Տեր-Թադևոսյան – Дживан Тер-Татевосян (1926–1988)
     Sonata for viola solo (1978); Sovetsky Kompozitor
 Lionel Tertis (1876–1975)
     Elizabethan Melody for viola and cello (published 1961); Bosworth & Co.
     15th Century Folk Song: 1452-Anonymous for viola, cello and piano (published 1961); Bosworth & Co.
     Hier au soir for viola and piano (published 1925); Schott Music
     Old Irish Air for viola and piano (published 1925); G. Schirmer; Schott Music
     Rêverie for viola and piano
     Sunset (Coucher du Soleil) for viola and piano (published 1923); Chester Music; Comus Edition
     Three Sketches for viola and piano
       1. Serenade; revised as A Tune
       2. The Blackbirds (1952); Comus Edition
       3. The River; Comus Edition
     A Tune for viola and piano (published 1954); 2nd version of Serenade; Comus Edition
     Variations on a Four Bar Theme of Handel for viola and cello (published 1961); Francis, Day & Hunter
     Variations on a Passacaglia of Handel for 2 violas (1935); Comus Edition
 Dimitri Terzakis (b. 1938)
     Daphnis and Chloe for soprano and viola (1993–1994); Edition Gravis
     Etanos for viola and piano (2006); Müller & Schade
     Hero und Leander, Rhapsody for narrator, viola, piano and audiotape (2002–2003); Edition Gravis
     Musica aeolica, 2 Pieces for violin and viola (1978); Breitkopf & Härtel
     Myrrhentropfen for viola and piano (1993); Edition Gravis
     Solo for Tanja for viola solo (2004); Edition Gravis
     Sonetto for viola and piano (1993); Edition Gravis
     Visionen, die Schalen des Zorns betreffend for chorus and viola ad libitum (2004); Edition Gravis
 Flavio Testi (1923–2014)
     Musica da Concerto No. 6 for viola and chamber orchestra, Op. 20 (1970); Ricordi
 Giampaolo Testoni (b. 1957)
     Corale for violin or viola solo, Op. 14 (1984–1985); Casa Ricordi
 Arash Teymourian (b. 1976)
     Concerto for viola and string orchestra
 Jim Theobald (b. 1950)
     Concerto for viola, bass drum, prepared piano and winds (1978)
     Scherzo Agitato for viola and piano; Viola World Publications
 Christopher Theofanidis (b. 1967)
     Concerto for viola and chamber orchestra (2002); Opus 125 Publishing
     Flow, My Tears for viola solo (1997); Opus 125 Publishing
 J. Théron
     Deux Pièces (2 Pieces) for viola (or cello) and piano (c.1890); J. Hamelle
 Hans Joachim Therstappen (1905–1950)
     Kammersonate (Chamber Sonata) for viola and piano, Op. 11 (1929)
 Britton Theurer (b. 1953)
     G.M. Inc.: Got rhythm?, Duet for violin and viola (2003)
 Ferdinand Thieriot (1838–1919)
     2 Adagios for cello or viola and organ, Op. 41 (1887)
     Concerto in C major for violin, viola and orchestra, Op. 92 (1910)
     Larghetto in B minor for viola and organ, Op. 76 No. 1
 Johannes Paul Thilman (1906–1973)
     Aspekte for flute, viola and harp (1971); Edition Peters
     6 Duets for violin and viola (1964); Edition Peters
     Sonata in C minor for viola and piano (1935)
     Trio Piccolo for alto flute, bass clarinet and viola, Op. 90 (1959); Edition Peters
 Marc-Didier Thirault
     Conte à deux (Tale for Two) for cello or viola and piano (2001); Éditions Gérard Billaudot; United Music Publishers
 Maurice Thiriet (1906–1972)
     Suite en Trio for flute, viola and harp (1955–1956); Les Nouvelles Éditions Méridian
 Anna S. Þorvaldsdóttir (b. 1977)
     Emotional Landscape of a Charmed Friendship for viola solo (2006); Íslenzk Tónverkamiðstöð
 Pierre Thoma (b. 1949)
     Ton sur ton for viola and clarinet (1985)
 Xaver Paul Thoma (b. 1953)
     Concerto for viola and orchestra, Op. 34, XPT 46 (1984, revised 1988); edition 49
     Die Blumen II (The Flowers II) for soprano and viola, XPT 146 (2006); edition 49
     Die Traumtragenden (The Bearers of Dreams) for 8 violas and soprano, Op. 12, XPT 15 (1975); edition 49
     Drei Impressionen nach Gedichten von Paul Celan (3 Impressions after Poems of Paul Celan) for 2 violas, Op. 22b, XPT 27 (1980); edition 49
     Duet for English horn and viola, XPT 72 (1988); edition 49
     Entdeckungen (Discoveries), 10 Miniatures for Young Violists, XPT 156 (2007); edition 49
     Fragment for viola and organ, XPT 50 (1984); edition 49
     In Erwartung for viola solo, XPT 62 (1985); edition 49
     In ferner Erwartung – Träume – Stille for 8 violas, XPT 84 (1992); edition 49
     Kleine Sonate (Little Sonata) for violin and viola, Op. 5, XPT 6 (1973); edition 49
     Lathe Biosas I for 6 violas, Op. 29 No. 1, XPT 38 (1982); edition 49
     3 Lieder (3 Songs) for alto and viola, Op. 11, XPT 14 (1974); edition 49
     Mein umdunkeltes Herz for soprano, viola and piano, XPT 113 (1988); edition 49
     M'illumino d'immenso – Nachtstück III (Nocturne III) for viola and cello, Op. 31b, XPT 43 (1983); edition 49
     Nachtstück II (Nocturne II) for 4 violas, Op. 31a, XPT 42 (1983); edition 49
     Nachtstück IV (Nocturne IV) for violin and viola, Op. 31c, XPT 44 (1983); edition 49
     Phantasie for 2 violas, Op. 10, XPT 13 (1974); edition 49
     Psalm 86 for mezzo-soprano, viola and organ, Op. 40 (1985); edition 49
     Reflexionen eines musikalischen Traumas (Reflections of a Musical Trauma) for viola and orchestra, Op. 20, XPT 24 (1979); edition 49
     Requiem für einen Hund (In Memoriam Agapi) (Requiem for a Dog) for 5 violas and cello, XPT 61 (1985); edition 49
     Sonata [No. 1] for viola solo, Op. 26, XPT 36 (1982); edition 49
     Sonata No. 2 for viola solo, XPT 71 (1988); edition 49
     Sonata No. 3 for viola solo, XPT 109 (1998); Antes Edition; edition 49
     Sonata No. 4 for viola solo, XPT 158a (2008); Ikuro Edition
     Sonata for viola and piano, XPT 81 (1990–1991); Antes Edition; edition 49
     Studie "El Escorial" for viola solo, XPT 65 (1987); edition 49
     William Byrd Mass a 3 Voices for 3 violas, XPT 40 (1982); edition 49
 Ambroise Thomas (1811–1896) 
     Souvenir, Duetto in E major for violin or viola and piano (1854)
 Anton Thomas
     8 Morceaux de Salon for viola (or cello) and piano, Op. 5 (1885)
 Augusta Read Thomas (b. 1964)
     Cantos for Slava for viola and piano (2007); original for cello and piano; G. Schirmer
     Chant for viola and piano (1991); G. Schirmer
     Dream Catcher for viola solo (2008); original for violin; G. Schirmer
     Incantation for viola solo (1995, 2002); original for violin; G. Schirmer
     Pulsar for viola solo (2003); original for violin; G. Schirmer
     Rumi Settings for violin and viola (2001); G. Schirmer
     Silent Moon for violin and viola (2006); G. Schirmer
     Toft Serenade for viola and piano (2006, 2011); original for violin and piano; G. Schirmer
 David Evan Thomas (b. 1958)
     A Healing Benediction for flute, viola and harp (2003); Fatrock Ink
     In the Blue Glen for flute, viola and harp (2004); Fatrock Ink
     Partners in Rhyme for viola and cello (1999)
 Émile Thomas
     Sonatina in C for viola and piano (published c.1888); Augener
 Theodore Thomas (1835–1905)
     Divertissement for viola and piano (1860); American Viola Society Publications
 Olav Anton Thommessen (b. 1946)
     Cantabile "Etyde-Cadenza" for solo viola; Music Information Centre Norway
     Sort sang (Black Song) for viola and piano (1992); Music Information Centre Norway
 Randall Thompson (1899–1984)
     Suite for oboe, clarinet and viola (1940); E.C. Schirmer
 Virgil Thomson (1896–1989)
     Sonata da chiesa for viola, clarinet, trumpet, horn and trombone (1926, revised 1973); Boosey & Hawkes
 Jón Þórarinsson (1917–2012)
     Sonata for clarinet or viola and piano (1964);  Musica Islandica; Menningarsjóður; Íslenzk Tónverkamiðstöð
 Hilmar Þórðarson (b. 1960)
     Computer Play for viola, piano and computer (1988)
     Kveðja (Elegy) for viola solo (1990); Íslenzk Tónverkamiðstöð
     Sononymus for viola and computer; Íslenzk Tónverkamiðstöð
 Lasse Thoresen (b. 1949)
     Tidehverv (At a Juncture), 3 Pieces for viola and cello (2007); Pizzicato Verlag Helvetia; Clivis Publicacions
 Mist Þorkelsdóttir (b. 1960)
     Líf í tuskunni (Lively Rag) for viola solo (1987); Íslenzk Tónverkamiðstöð
     Skálholts Trio for oboe, viola and harp (1994); Íslenzk Tónverkamiðstöð
 Benjamin Thorn (b. 1961)
     Chickpeas II for viola solo (1986); Australian Music Centre
 Francis Thorne (1922–2017)
     Rhapsodic Variations No. 4 for viola solo (1987); Merion Music; Theodore Presser Company; American Composers Alliance
     Double Concerto "Gemini Variations" for orchestra with viola and double bass obbligati (1967–1968); American Composers Alliance
     Triple Concerto for viola, English horn, bass clarinet and orchestra (2003–2004); Theodore Presser Company
     Vi-oh-la-la for solo viola (2009); Merion Music; Theodore Presser
 Nicholas C. K. Thorne (b. 1953)
     4 Miniatures for viola solo
 Simon Thorne
     Flux for viola and prepared piano (2006)
     Forgotten and Remembered Waltzes for viola and piano (1986, 2005); Welsh Music Information Centre
 Ludwig Thuille (1861–1907)
     Trio in E major for violin, viola and piano (1885)
 Friedrich Eugen Thurner (1785–1827)
     Grande Sonate for horn or viola and piano, Op. 29 (1817)
 Gunnar Thyrestam (1900–1984)
     Sonatina for viola and organ (1971–1976); STIM; Swedish Music Information Centre
 Henri Tibbe (1863–1895)
     Albumblatt (Album Leaf) in G minor for viola and piano, Op. 7 (1887)
     Sérénade, Morceau de salon in G minor for viola and piano (1884)
 Niso Ticciati (1924–1972)
     Minuet and Berceuse for viola and piano (published 1966); Oxford University Press
     Scherzo and Toccata for viola and piano (published 1966); Oxford University Press
 Bertha Tideman-Wijers (1887–1976)
     Adagio en Andante cantabile in F and D major for viola and piano
     Andante cantabile in A major for viola and piano
 Jukka Tiensuu (b. 1948)
     oddjob for viola and electronics (1995); Finnish Music Information Center
 Heinz Tiessen (1887–1971)
     Musik für Viola mit Orgel (Music for Viola with Organ), Op. 59 (c.1950, published 1964); Ries & Erler
     Zwei Ernste Weisen (2 Serious Melodies) for viola and piano (published 1948); Ries & Erler
 László Tihanyi (b. 1956)
     50 misure a S. (50 Bars for S.) for violin and viola, Op. 56 (2011)
     Ductus for viola solo, Op. 3 (1986)
     Nyolc invokáció a Hold fázisaihoz (Eight Invocations to the Lunar Phases) for viola and piano, Op. 53 (2010–2011); Editio Musica Budapest
     Passacaglie for viola and orchestra, Op. 49 (2009); Editio Musica Budapest
 Frederick Tillis (1930–2020) 
     Capriccio for viola and piano (1960); American Composers Alliance
     Phantasy for viola and piano (1962); P & P Publications
     Three Showpieces for viola unaccompanied (1966); American Composers Alliance
 Vasile Timiș (1922–2014)
     Passacaglia for viola solo (2003)
 Michael Tippett (1905–1998)
     Triple Concerto for violin, viola, cello and orchestra (1978–1979); Schott Music
 Heuwell Tircuit (1931–2010)
     Sonata "Homage to Mahler" for viola and piano (1961); Associated Music Publishers
 Antoine Tisné (1932–1998)
     Concerto for viola and orchestra (1985)
     Horizons for clarinet and viola (1987); Éditions Gérard Billaudot; United Music Publishers
     Sonata for viola and piano (1989); Éditions Gérard Billaudot; United Music Publishers
 Steve Tittle (b. 1935)
     4 Messages for viola and percussion (1984); Canadian Music Centre
 Katia Tiutiunnik (b. 1967)
     Al-Hisar for viola solo (2001); Australian Music Centre
     Dumuzi's Embrace for viola solo (2018); Australian Music Centre
     Jehanne for soprano and viola (2007); text by Elisabetta Faenza Brandson; Australian Music Centre
     Nights in Arabia for solo viola and orchestra (1992, revised 1998); Australian Music Centre
     Prayer for viola solo (2002); Australian Music Centre
     White Night for viola solo (2006); Australian Music Centre
 Zlata Tkach (1928–2006) – see Zlata Tcaci
 Amali Tlil (1928–1996)
     Concerto for viola and orchestra, Op. 23 (1966); Éditions Jobert; Theodore Presser Company
 Ernst Toch (1887–1964)
     Divertimento for violin and viola, Op. 37 No. 2 (1925); Schott Music
     Impromptu (in three movements) for viola solo, Op. 90b (1963); Mills Music Company
     Serenade for 2 violins and viola, Op. 25 (1916); Delkas Music Publishing
 Louis Toebosch (1916–2009)
     Toccata, Aria e Finale for viola solo, Op. 102 (1969); Donemus
     Trois Conversations for viola solo, Op. 161 (1995–1996); Donemus
 Václav Tomášek (1774–1850)
     Grand Trio in E major for violin, viola and piano, Op. 7 (1800)
 Henri Tomasi (1901–1971)
     Concerto for viola and orchestra (1950); Éditions Alphonse Leduc
 Haukur Tómasson (b. 1960)
     Birting (Illumination) for viola solo (1986); Íslenzk Tónverkamiðstöð
 Jónas Tómasson (b. 1946)
     Innganga (Introitus) for flute, viola and organ (1995); Íslenzk Tónverkamiðstöð
     Melodia for viola solo (1979); Íslenzk Tónverkamiðstöð
     Notturno III for viola and harpsichord (1980); Íslenzk Tónverkamiðstöð
     Symphony No.  1.73 for viola and small orchestra (1969); Íslenzk Tónverkamiðstöð
 Matija Tomc (1899–1986)
     Caprice for viola and piano (1964); Društvo Slovenskih Skladateljev
     Elegija for viola and piano (1964); Društvo Slovenskih Skladateljev
 Petr Tomeš (b. 1980)
     Violdeon for viola and accordion; Český Hudební Fond
 Olena Tomlonova – Альона (Олена) Святославівна Томльонова (b. 1963)
     Sonata for viola and piano (2008)
 Matthew Tommasini (b. 1978)
     Sonata for viola and piano (2000)
 Vincenzo Tommasini (1878–1950)
     Concerto for string quartet and orchestra (1938); G. Ricordi
 Ottone Tonetti (1912–1999)
     Trilogia petriana for mezzo-soprano, viola and piano (1960); Edizioni G. Zanibon
 Babür Tongur (b. 1955)
     Sonata for viola and piano (1984)
 Tôn-Thất Tiết (b. 1933)
     Contemplation for viola and orchestra (1994–1997); Éditions Billaudot
     The Endless Murmuring III for viola, bassoon and harp (1995); Éditions Jobert
     Lang dzu for clarinet, viola and cello (1996)
     Lang Dzu II for clarinet, viola and cello (1997)
     Lang Dzu III for clarinet, viola and cello (2004)
     Terre-Feu for viola solo (1981); Éditions Jobert
 Benno Torrenga (b. 1942)
     Serenade for viola and wind ensemble (1976); Donemus
 Jaume Torrent (b. 1953)
     A Souvenir of Piedmont for viola and guitar, Op. 64 (2009); Editorial de Música Boileau
     Canto for violin and viola (1999); Tritó Edicions
     Fantasía for viola and piano (1998); Tritó Edicions
     Piezas místicas (Mystical Pieces) for viola solo (2006); Tritó Edicions
     Trío for alto flute, viola and guitar (1997); Valentino Bucchi Edicions
 Vieri Tosatti (1920–1999)
     Concerto for viola and orchestra (1966)
 Orestis Toufektsis (b. 1966); 
     chrinope for flute (and piccolo), bassclarinet and viola (2009); Music Information Centre Austria
     echochronoi for viola and live electronics (2008); Music Information Centre Austria
     Interferenz III for viola, saxophone, shadow theatre and live video processing (2007); Music Information Centre Austria
     µ(3) ι(5) κ(7) ρ(11) ο for viola solo (1995); Music Information Centre Austria
 Charles Tournemire (1870–1939)
     Suite en trois parties (Suite in Three Parts) for viola and piano, Op. 11 (1897); Éditions Max Eschig
 Franz Tournier (1923–2010)
     Jeux de cordes et Jeux de doigts for viola and piano; Collection Panorama: Œuvres Contemporaines, Volume 2 (1987); Éditions Gérard Billaudot
 Donald Francis Tovey (1875–1940)
     Sonata in B major for clarinet (or violin, or viola) and piano, Op. 16 (1906); Edition Schott
     Trio in D minor for violin, English horn (or viola) and piano, Op. 14 (1903); Edition Schott
 Joan Tower (b. 1938)
     Simply Purple for viola solo (2008); G. Schirmer
     Purple Rhapsody for viola and orchestra (2005); G. Schirmer
     Purple Rush for viola solo (2016); G. Schirmer
     Wild Purple for viola solo (1998); G. Schirmer
 Douglas Townsend (1921–2012)
     Canzona for flute, viola and bassoon (1950)
     Duo for 2 violas, Op. 5 (1957); Edition Peters
 Vlastimir Trajković (1947–2017)
     Concerto in G minor for viola and orchestra, Op. 23 (1993)
     Sonata in D major for violin and viola, Op. 20 (1987)
 Herbert Trantow (1903–1993)
     Duo for viola and piano (1936); Mitteldeutscher Verlag
 Martino Traversa (b. 1960)
     Quartetto for viola solo (2006); Edizioni Suvini Zerboni
 Yngve Jan Trede (1933–2010)
     Concerto for viola and orchestra (1985); Edition Wilhelm Hansen
 Felix Treiber (b. 1960)
     6 Capricen (6 Caprices) for viola solo (1999); Antes Edition
     4 Stücke (4 Pieces) for flute, violin and viola (1992)
     Trio for violin, viola and piano (1993)
 Karl Ottomar Treibmann (1936–2017)
     Tonspiele for viola solo (2007); Friedrich Hofmeister Musikverlag
 Ronald Tremain (1923–1998)
     Nine Studies for violin and viola (1960); Centre for New Zealand Music
     Three Poems of James Joyce for baritone and viola (1975, revised 1990); Centre for New Zealand Music
     Three Songs for soprano and viola (1960); Centre for New Zealand Music
 George Tremblay (1911–1982)
     Duo for viola and piano (1966); American Composers Alliance
 Gilles Tremblay (1932–2017)
     En partage, Concerto for viola and orchestra (2002); Canadian Music Centre
 Francesco Trevani
     Sonata No. 1 in E major for viola and piano (early 19th century); Verlag Doblinger
     Sonata No. 2 in C minor for viola and piano (early 19th century); Verlag Doblinger
     Sonata No. 3 in B major for viola and piano (early 19th century); Verlag Doblinger
 Georg Trexler (1903–1979)
     Sonatina for viola and piano (1953); Breitkopf & Härtel
 Lester Trimble (1923–1986)
     Duo for viola and piano (1949); C.F. Peters
 Gerardo Tristano (b. 1955)
     En for viola and piano (1992)
 Michal Trnka (b. 1972)
     Konrádovy tančící zuby (Konrad's Dancing Teeth), Experimental Suite for viola and percussion (2007); Český Hudební Fond
 Robert Trory
     Dances from Assynt for viola and piano (2011); Waveney Music Publishing
 Jan Truhlář (1928–2007)
     Bernské studny (Fountains of Bern), Trio for flute, viola and guitar, Op. 90 (1996); Schweizer Flöten Gesellschaft; Salm
     Résonances for viola, vibraphone and accordion, Op. 76 (1987)
     Romantisches Trio for flute, viola and guitar, Op. 90a (1953, revised 1995 and 2001)
 Balz Trümpy (b. 1946)
     Wendungen, 7 Duos for 2 violas (2005); Édition Musicale Suisse
 Julia Tsenova (1948–2010)
     Step and Rag-Time for viola and piano (1981)
     Three Frescoes with Epilogue for viola and piano (1976)
 Heinrich Julius Tschirch (1820–1867)
     Impromptu-Solo in C major for viola and piano, Op. 68 (published 1869)
 Karmella Tsepkolenko (b. 1955)
     Duel-Duo No. 6 (Дуель-Дует №6) for 2 violas (1997)
     Solo-Momento No. 3 (Соло-Моменто №3) for viola solo (2003)
 Irakli Tsintzadze (b. 1964)
     Sonata for viola and piano (1991); Keturi Musikverlag; Georgian Music Information Centre
 Sulkhan Tsintsadze (1925–1991)
     2 Pieces for viola and piano (1948)
         Khorumi, Georgian Dance (ხორუმი; Хоруми, Грузинский танец);  (State Music Publishing House); Muzyka
         Romance (Романс); Muzykalnyi fond Gruzinskoi SSR
     Sachidao (საჭიდაო; Сачидао) for viola and piano (1950); also for cello and piano; Russian Music Archive
 George Tsontakis (b. 1951)
     Fantasy for viola and piano (1976)
     Lullaby of Crete for soprano, flute, viola and harp (1999)
     Requiescat for viola and piano (1996); Merion Music; Theodore Presser Company
     Seven Knickknacks for violin and viola; Poco Forte Music
 Calliope Tsoupaki (b. 1963)
     Enigma for viola solo (1999); Donemus
     Medea (Μήδεια) for viola and 3 female voices (1996); words by Euripides
     When I Was 27 (Στα 27 μου χρόνια) for viola and double bass (1990); Donemus
 Vladimir Tsytovich – Владимир Иванович Цытович (1931–2012)
     Concerto for viola and chamber orchestra (1965);  (State Music Publishing House); Muzyka
     Triptych (Триптих) for viola and piano (1962); Kompozitor, St. Petersburg
 Eduard Tubin (1905–1982)
     Pastorale for viola and organ, ETW 62 (1956); Warner/Chappell Music Scandinavia
     Sonata for viola and piano, ETW 63 (1964–1965); Nordiska Musikförlaget
     Sonata for alto-saxophone and piano, ETW 61 (1951); transcribed for viola and piano; Nordiska Musikförlaget
 Antonín Tučapský (1928–2014)
     Concerto for viola and orchestra (1996); British Music Information Centre
     Duo Concertante for viola and guitar (1989); British Music Information Centre
     Sonata for viola and piano (2002); Roberton Publications
 Fisher Tull (1934–1994)
     Sonata for viola and piano (1962); Boosey & Hawkes
 Rudolf Tümler
     Elegy "Was ist das Glück" for viola and piano, Op. 11 (1937); Gleis
 Yalçın Tura (b. 1934)
     Concerto for viola and orchestra (1972, 1997)
     Sonata for viola and piano (2000)
     Süit (Suite) for English horn and viola (1951)
 Carl Türcke (1866–?)
     Thema mit Veränderungen (Theme with Variations) for viola (viola alta) and organ (or piano), Op. 9 (1891); C. F. Kahnt Musikverlag
 Joaquín Turina (1882–1949)
     Andante from Sevilla, Op. 2 (1908); transcribed for viola and piano by Vadim Borisovsky
     Escena andaluza (Scène Andalouse) for viola, string quartet and piano, Op. 7 (1911); A. Zunz-Mathot, Paris 1913
 José Luis Turina (b. 1952)
     Concerto for viola and string orchestra (1985)
     Divertimento, aria y serenata for 8 violas (1987); Edición Pypartes
     Dos duetos (2 Duets) for viola and piano (1988, 1992); original for cello and piano
     La commedia dell'arte for flute, viola and guitar (1986), or flute, viola and harp (1990)
     Sonata da chiesa for viola and piano (1986–1987)
     Tres contrapuntos for 2 violas (1979)
 Hans Peter Türk (b. 1940)
     Sonata for viola and cello (1968); Uniunea Bucharest
 Mark-Anthony Turnage (b. 1960)
     Eulogy for solo viola and orchestra (2003); Boosey & Hawkes
     On Opened Ground, Concerto for viola and orchestra (2000–2001); Schott Music
 Robert Turner (1920–2012)
     Concerto for viola and orchestra (1986–1987); Canadian Music Centre
     A Group of Seven: Poems of Love and Nature by Canadian Poets for viola, narrator and orchestra (1991); Canadian Music Centre
     Suite in Homage to Melville for soprano, alto, viola and piano (1966); Canadian Music Centre
     Time for Three, 3 Songs for mezzo-soprano, viola and piano (1985); Canadian Music Centre
 Sara Scott Turner (b. 1926)
     Reflections I & II for viola solo (1990); Canadian Music Centre
 Paul Turok (1929–2012)
     Canzone Concertante No. 7 for viola, string orchestra and percussion, Op. 87; Seesaw Music
     Sonata for viola solo, Op. 40 (1975); Seesaw Music
 Joseph Turrin (b. 1947)
     Fragments for alto saxophone and viola (2003)
     Preludium for viola and piano (2011)
 Burnet Corwin Tuthill (1888–1982)
     Sonata for viola (or saxophone) and piano, Op. 20 (1947); Southern Music Company
 Erkki-Sven Tüür (b. 1959)
     Illuminatio, Concerto for viola and orchestra (2008)
 Donald Tweedy (1890–1948)
     Sonata for viola and piano (1916)
 Sydney Twinn
     4 Discussions for violin and viola (1963); Hinrichsen Edition
 Michael Twomey (b. 1963)
     Exegesis for viola and live electronics
 Ivan Tylňák (1910–1969)
     Duo for violin and viola, Op. 10 (1946); Český Hudební Fond

U
 Hasan Uçarsu (b. 1965)
     Sürüklenenler... for flute, viola and harp (2004)
 Åke Uddén (1903–1987)
     Duo "Småprat" (Small Talk) for 2 violas (1933); STIM; Swedish Music Information Centre
     Sonata in D major for flute and viola, Op. 2 (1931); STIM; Swedish Music Information Centre
     Sonatina for viola solo, Op. 3 (1933, revised 1986); STIM; Swedish Music Information Centre
 Ken Ueno (b. 1970)
     12.12.12 for flute (with glissando head joint) and viola (2012)
     Hypnomelodiamachia for viola, percussion and electronics (2007)
     Song for Sendai for singing violist (2011)
     Talus for viola and live electronics (2006)
     Talus, Concerto for viola and string orchestra (2007)
     Two Hands for viola and percussion (2009)
 Alfred Uhl (1909–1992)
     Commedia musicale for clarinet, viola and piano (1982)
     10 Divertimenti for viola and cello (1924)
     20 Etüden for viola solo (1971); Schott Music
     30 Etüden for viola solo (1972); Schott Music
     Kleines Konzert for clarinet, viola and piano (1937, revised 1988); L. Doblinger
     Kleine Suite for viola solo (1973); Schott Music
     4 Lieder aus der Heiteren Kantate "Wer Einsam ist, der Hat es Gut" for soprano, viola and piano (1984); Doblinger
     Stimmungsbild for viola and piano (1923)
 Jürgen Ulrich (1939–2007)
     Gran duo C for viola and piano (1981); Möseler Verlag
 Lloyd Ultan (1929–1998)
     Dialogues II for viola and cello (1980); American Composers Alliance
     Dialogues III for violin and viola (1982); American Composers Alliance
     Love's Not Time's Fool for soprano, violin and viola (1995); American Composers Alliance
      Sonata for viola and piano (1976); American Composers Alliance
 Ekrem Zeki Ün (1910–1987)
     Düo for violin and viola (1985)
     Yudumluk for viola solo (1972); Remzi Kitabevi
 Chinary Ung (b. 1942)
     Khse Buon for solo viola (1980); C.F. Peters
 Kenjiro Urata – 浦田健次郎 (b. 1941)
     Arioso for viola and piano (1985)
 Ernst Ludwig Uray (1906–1988)
     Konzertante Musik for viola, piano and orchestra (1965); Verlag Doblinger
 Victor Urbancic (1903–1958)
     Fantasie und Fuge for viola and piano, Op. 9 (1937); Íslenzk Tónverkamiðstöð
 Guillermo Uribe Holguín (1880–1971)
     Concerto for viola and orchestra, Op. 109 (1962)
     Escena cómica (Comic Scene) for violin and viola, Op. 108 No. 2
     Pequeña suite (Little Suite) for violin, viola and flute, Op. 96 (1955)
     Sonata for viola and piano, Op. 24 (1924)
 Reinhold Urmetzer (b. 1950)
     Salve Regina for viola solo (1996); Tre Media Musikverlage
 İlhan Usmanbaş (b. 1921)
     Viyola ve Piyano için (For Viola and Piano) for viola and piano (1961)
     Partita for viola solo (1985)
 Vladislav Uspensky – Владислав Александрович Успенский (1937–2004)
     Concerto for viola, chamber orchestra and mixed chorus (2002); Kompozitor
 Murat Üstün (b. 1959)
     İz'ler (Traces; Spuren) for viola solo (2005)
 Craig Utting (b. 1965)
     Collages for 12 violas (1992); Centre for New Zealand Music
     Duel for 2 violas and harp (1986)
     Five Campbell Songs for choir or voice, viola and piano (1990); Centre for New Zealand Music
     Locomotion for 6 violas; Centre for New Zealand Music
     Pachelbel Canon and Gig Music for 4 violas (and cello ad libitum); Centre for New Zealand Music
 Yolande Uyttenhove (1925–2000)
     Sonata for viola and piano, Op. 146 (1989); CeBeDeM
 Charles Uzor (b. 1961)
     Patmos for viola and piano (1992)

V
 Knut Vaage (b. 1961)
     Endelig (Finally) for narrator, viola and string quartet (1998); words by Ove Røsbak
 Dalibor Cyril Vačkář (1906–1984)
     Tři dialogy (3 Dialogues) for viola solo (1961); Český Hudební Fond
 Emanuel Vahl (b. 1938)
     Jewish Duet for viola and guitar or piano, Op. 69b (2000); Israeli Music Center
     Sonata for viola solo, Op. 2 No. 2 (1968); Israeli Music Center
     Sonata for viola and piano, Op. 89 (2004); Israeli Music Center
     Suite for 2 violas, Op. 67b, for viola and cello, Op. 67d, for violin and viola, Op. 67e (1999); original for 2 cellos; Israeli Music Center
 Moisei Samuilovich Vainberg (1919–1996), see below Mieczysław Weinberg
 János Vajda (b. 1949)
     Szólószonáta (Solo Sonata) for viola solo (2004); Editio Musica Budapest Contemporary Music
 Francesco Valdambrini (1933–2007)
     19 Momente for flute (or violin) and viola (1964); Universal Edition
 Jiří Válek (1923–2005)
     Concerto "Lirico" for viola and orchestra (1977); Český Hudební Fond
     Concerto "Shakespearovský" ("Shakespearean") for violin, viola and chamber orchestra (1976); Český Hudební Fond
     Double Concerto on Themes from Plays of William Shakespeare for violin, viola and orchestra (1973)
     Dramatická fresca (Dramatic Fresco) for viola solo (1980); Český Hudební Fond
     Katedrála (Cathedral) for violin and viola solo with chamber orchestra (1978); Český Hudební Fond
     Katedrála (Cathedral), Musical Fresco for viola and string orchestra (1978); Český Hudební Fond
     Nenia for viola solo (1970); Český Hudební Fond
      (Shakespearean Frescoes) for violin, viola and string orchestra (1980); Český Hudební Fond
     Sonata No. 2 "Tragic" for viola and piano (1961); Panton; Český Hudební Fond
     Symphony No. 9 "Renesanční" ("Renaissance"), Triple Concerto for  violin, viola and cello soli with string orchestra (1971); Český Hudební Fond
     Symphony No. 11 "Revoluční" ("Revolutionary") for piano trio (violin, viola, piano), woodwind quintet (flute, oboe, clarinet, bassoon, horn) and large orchestra (1974); Panton; Český Hudební Fond
     Symphony No. 12 "Shakespearovský" ("Shakespearean"), Double Concerto (Version I) for violin and viola soli with string orchestra, piano and percussion (1975); Panton
     Symphony No. 12 "Shakespearovský" ("Shakespearean"), Double Concerto (Version II) for violin and viola soli with large orchestra (1976); Panton; Český Hudební Fond
     Tři nokturna (Three Nocturnes) for viola and harpsichord; Český Hudební Fond
     Tři nokturna: Praha v noci (Three Nocturnes: Prague at Night) for viola and string orchestra (1960); Český Hudební Fond
 Reza Vali (b. 1952)
     Calligraphy No. 5 for viola solo (2003); MMB Music
 Jacques Vallier (b. 1922)
     Fantasie for viola solo (1972); Éditions Françaises de Musique Technisonor; United Music Publishers
 Mary Jeanne van Appledorn (1927–2014)
     4 Duos for viola and cello (1986); Arsis Press
 Nancy Van de Vate (b. 1930)
     Concerto for viola and orchestra (1990); Vienna Masterworks
     6 Etudes for solo viola (1969); Arsis Press
     A Long Road Travelled, Suite for solo viola and string quartet (2007); Vienna Masterworks
     Music for Viola, Percussion and Piano (1976); Vienna Masterworks
     Sonata for viola and piano (1964); Tritone Press; Vienna Masterworks
     Suite for solo viola (1975); American Composers Alliance
 Max Vandermaesbrugge (b. 1933)
     Le capricieux for violin and viola, Op. 27 (1968); CeBeDeM
 Leopold van der Pals (1884–1966)
     Concertino for saxophone or viola and string orchestra, Op. 108
     Musik zu «Die Geheimnisse» von Goethe (Music for Goethe's "The Mysteries") for viola and piano, Op. 220
     Sonata for viola solo, Op. 146
 Renier Van der Velden (1910–1993)
     Kamermuziek for viola and instrumental ensemble (1956); CeBeDeM
 Theo van Doren (1898–1974)
     Verheffing (Exaltation) for viola and piano, Op. 14 (1959); Editions J. Maurer
 Alex Van Gils (b. 1987)
     A Dot in Space for viola and live electronics (2013)
     Still Life with Flowers for viola, alto flute and bass clarinet (2012)
 Geert Van Hoorick (b. 1968)
     Sonata in D minor for viola and piano, Op. 64 (2014)
 David Van Vactor (1906–1994) 
     Concerto for viola and orchestra (1940); Roger Rhodes Music
     Duo (3 Pieces) for viola and double bass (1966); Roger Rhodes Music
     Divertimento for 2 violins and viola (1936, 1942); Roger Rhodes Music
 Arnold van Wyk (1916–1983)
     Duo Concertante for viola and piano (1962–1976)
 Jan Křtitel Vaňhal (1739–1813) – see Johann Baptist Wanhal
 Komitas Vardapet (1869–1935)
     The Crane for viola and percussion (1911)
     It Is Spring, but Snow Has Fallen for voice, viola, piano and percussion (1905–1906)
 Emanuel Vardi (1917–2011)
     Suite Based on American Folk Songs for viola and piano (1977); Emvar Music Publishing
     Suite on American Folk Songs for viola and orchestra (or piano) (1944); G. Schirmer
 Víctor Varela (b. 1955)
     Viola pomposa for viola solo (2006); STIM; Swedish Music Information Centre
 Anatoly Varelas – Анатолий Варелас (b. 1950)
     Concerto Grosso for viola and chamber orchestra (2001)
     Duo for violin and viola (2002)
     Two Pieces (Две пьесы) for viola and piano (1984)
 Dmitry Varelas – Дмитрий Варелас (b. 1978)
     Partita for cello or viola solo (2004)
 Judit Varga (b. 1979)
     Dialog for clarinet, viola and piano (2004)
     Ewig, ewig for viola solo and ensemble (2006)
     10 Portraits for viola solo (2010)
     Strictly Ballroom IV for baritone saxophone, bayan and viola (2006)
     Unausgesprochen for viola solo (2004)
 Darwin Vargas Wallis (1925–1988)
     Sonata No. 1 for viola and piano (1963–1968)
 Béla Várkonyi (1878–1946)
     Leda, Fantasy for viola and piano, Op. 42a (1929)
 Ferenc Váry (1928–2004)
     Conversazione for clarinet, viola and piano (1976)
 Sergei Vasilenko (1872–1956)
     Lullaby (Колыбельная) for viola and piano (1950s)
     Oriental Dance (Восточный танец) in G minor for clarinet or viola and piano, Op. 47 (1922)
     4 Pieces (4 Пьесы) for viola and piano (1953)
     4 Pieces on Themes from 16th and 17th-Century Lute Music (Четыре пьесы на темы лютневой музыку XVI и XVII вв.) for cello (or viola) and piano, Op. 35 (1918);  (State Music Publishing House); Universal Edition
     Sleeping River (Спящая река) for viola and piano (1951)
     Sonata in D minor for viola and piano, Op. 46 (1923);  (State Music Publishing House)
     Zodiakus I.A.S. (after Unknown Authors of the 18th Century) (Сюита из произведений неизвестных авторов XVIII века), Suite for viola and piano (1914, 1930s)
 Pēteris Vasks (b. 1946)
     Concerto for viola and string orchestra (2014–2015); Schott Music
     Mazā vasaras mūzika (Little Summer Music; Kleine Sommermusik) for viola and piano (1985, 2012); original version for violin and piano; Schott Music
 Nadir Vassena (b. 1970)
     rivolto verso terra – rivolto verso il mare (turned towards earth – turned towards the sea) for viola and cello (2001); Collegium Novum Zürich
 Auguste Vaucorbeil (1821–1884)
     Sonata for viola and piano (published 1862)
 Ralph Vaughan Williams (1972–1958)
     Fantasia on Greensleeves (1934); adapted from Sir John in Love; transcription for viola and piano by Watson Forbes; Oxford University Press
     Flos Campi for viola, wordless chorus and small orchestra (1925)
     Four Hymns for tenor, viola and string orchestra (1914)
     Romance for viola and piano (c.1914); Oxford University Press
     Six Studies in English Folk Song for cello or viola and piano (1926); Stainer & Bell
     Suite for viola and small orchestra (1933–1934); Oxford University Press
     A Winter's Willow (A Country Song) (1903); transcription for viola and piano by Ronald C. Dishinger (1993), Medici Music Press
 Raymond Vauterin (b. 1932)
     Lento for viola and piano (1965)
     Neuf miniatures (9 Miniatures) for viola, alto saxophone and synthesizer (2001)
 Octavio Vázquez (b. 1972)
     Sonata No. 1 for viola and piano (1992)
     Sonata No. 2 for viola and piano (2002)
     Trio for flute, viola and cello (2003)
 Andris Vecumnieks (b. 1964)
     Variācijas (Variations) for viola and cello (1998); Musica Baltica
     Monologs ar klavierēm altam solo (Monologue with Piano for Solo Viola) for viola and piano (1997); Musica Baltica
 Alexandru Velehorschi (Velehorský) (1918–1997)
     Pastorală for cello or viola and piano (1961); Editura Muzicală, Bucharest
 Richard Vella (b. 1954)
     Tales of Love Suite for clarinet and viola, or clarinet, viola and piano (1990); Australian Music Centre
 Lucie Vellère (1896–1966)
     Epitaphe pour un ami (Epitaph for a Friend) for viola and string orchestra (1964); CeBeDeM
     Sonata for violin and viola (1961); CeBeDeM
 Ian Venables (b. 1955)
     Acton Burnell for tenor, viola and piano, Op. 30 (1997); words by Rennie Parker
     Elegy for viola and piano, Op. 2a (1980); original version for cello and piano
     Soliloquy for viola and piano, Op. 26 (1994)
 Alexander Veprik (1899–1958)
     Chant rigoureux (Строгий напев) for viola and piano, Op. 9 (1926); original for clarinet and piano; transcription by Vadim Borisovsky
     Kaddish (Кадиш: Поэма), Poem for viola and piano, Op. 6 (1925); Edition Schott
     Rhapsodie (Рапсодия) for viola and piano, Op. 11 (1926); Muzyka; Universal Edition
     Songs of the Dead (Песни об умерших; Totenlieder) for viola and piano, Op. 4 (1923)
 Theo Verbey (1959–2019)
     Hommage II for viola solo (1995); Donemus
 Carl Verbraeken (b. 1950)
     Schaduwdans for viola and piano (2013); CWV1611
 Yaroslav Vereshchagin (or Vereshchahin) – Верещагін Ярослав Романович (1948–1999)
     Concerto for viola and orchestra (1972); Muzichia Ukraina, Kiev
 Sándor Veress (1907–1992)
     Memento for viola and double bass (1983); Edizioni Suvini Zerboni
     Nógrádi verbunkos for viola and string orchestra (1940, 1956); arrangement by D. Marton; Musikverlag Müller & Schade
 Antonio Veretti (1900–1978)
     Bicinia for violin and viola (1975); Edizioni Suvini Zerboni
 Ary Verhaar (1900–1994)
     Monoloog (Monologue) for viola solo, Op. 61 (1964)
     Pastoral Sketches for mezzo-soprano, viola obligato and piano ad libitum, Op. 74 (1978)
Theodorus Hendricus Hubertus Verhey (1848–1929)
     Vier Charakterstücke (4 Character Pieces) for clarinet or viola and piano, Op. 3 (1873)
 John Verrall (1908–2001)
     Concerto for viola and orchestra (1969); American Composers Alliance
     Sonata No. 1 for viola and piano (1942); Dow Music; American Composers Alliance
     Sonata No. 2 for viola and piano (1963); Edition Peters
     Sonatina for viola and piano (1961); Dow Music; American Composers Alliance
 Alexey Verstovsky (1799–1862)
     Variations on Two Themes (Вариации на две темы) for viola and piano; transcription by Vadim Borisovsky (1950);  (State Music Publishing House)
 Jacques Veyrier (b. 1928)
     Danse de Champagne for viola and piano; Éditions Pierre Lafitan
     Grave et allegro for viola and piano (1968); Éditions Heugel
     Légende et rondo for viola and piano; Éditions Pierre Lafitan
     Pastorales for violin and viola (2010); Éditions Delatour
 Andersen Viana (b. 1962)
     Cantilena for viola solo (2003)
     Entretenimentos No. 1 for flute and viola (1982)
     Entretenimentos No. 2 for viola and string orchestra (1983)
     Fantasieta for viola solo (1983)
     Fantasieta for viola and piano (1984)
     Segunda Neo-Valsa for orchestra of violas (2005)
     Três Peças (Three Pieces) for violin and viola (1981)
 Jan Vičar (b. 1949)
     Musica profonda for viola and double bass (2003); Český Hudební Fond
 László Vidovszky (b. 1944)
     The Death of My Viola for viola and chamber ensemble (1996–2004)
     The Death of My Viola No. 2 for viola and chamber ensemble (1999)
     Lear, Ballet in 1 act for violin and viola (1988)
     Machaut-kommentárok (Commentaries on Machaut) for voice and viola (2000)
     Tizenkét duó (12 Duos) for violin and viola (1986); Editio Musica Budapest
 Michael Vidulich (b. 1946)
     Concerto on Maori Songs from New Zealand and the Cook Islands for viola and string orchestra (1992); Australia and New Zealand Viola Society
     Concertpiece in C minor for viola solo (1993); Australia and New Zealand Viola Society
     Suite for solo viola (1989, revised 1990)
 Massimiliano Viel (b. 1964)
     invenzione for viola or violin and electronic sounds (1996)
 Louis Vierne (1870–1937)
     Deux Pièces (Two Pieces) for viola or cello and piano, Op. 5 (1894–1895)
        Le Soir in F major
        Légende in D minor
 Maurice Vieux (1884–1951)
     20 Études for viola solo (1927); Éditions Alphonse Leduc
     6 Études de concert for viola and piano (1928–1932); Éditions Alphonse Leduc; Éditions Max Eschig; Associated Music Publishers
     10 Études sur des traits d'orchestre for viola solo (1928); Éditions Alphonse Leduc
     10 Études sur les intervalles for viola solo (1931); Éditions Alphonse Leduc
     Scherzo for viola and piano (1928); Éditions Alphonse Leduc
 Henri Vieuxtemps (1820–1881)
     Capriccio "Hommage à Paganini" in C minor for viola solo, Op. 55 (Op. 9 posthumous); published 1883
     Duo Brillant in A major for violin, cello (or viola) and orchestra, Op. 39 (1864?)
     Élégie in F minor for viola and piano, Op. 30 (1854?)
     Étude in C minor for viola and piano; G. Schirmer
     Sonata in B major for viola and piano, Op. 36 (1862)
     Sonate inachevée (Allegro et Scherzo) in B major for viola and piano, Op. 60 (Op. 14 posthumous); published 1884
 Andrea Vigani (b. 1970)
     Muser d'hiver for viola solo (2001), or for viola and live electronics (2002)
 Miloš Vignati (1897–1966)
     Pathetická suita (Suite pathétique) for viola and piano; Český Hudební Fond
     Sonata quasi ballata for viola solo, Op. 12 (1943); Hudební Matice Umělecké Besedy
 Alfred Viguier (1828–1904)
     Premier Morceau de salon for viola and piano, Op. 1 (published 1859)
     Rêverie: Andante et Allegretto for viola and piano, Op. 7 (ca.1868)
     Deuxième Morceau de salon: Romance et Canzonnette for viola and piano, Op. 4 (ca.1860)
 Heitor Villa-Lobos (1887–1959)
     Aria (Cantilena) from Bachiana Brasileira No. 5 (1938–1945), transcription for viola and piano by William Primrose (1947); Associated Music Publishers
     Duo for violin and viola (1946); Music Press
 Edmundo Villani-Côrtes (b. 1930)
     Concerto for viola and orchestra
     Interlúdio V for viola and piano
     Sonata for viola and piano (1969)
 Pierre Villette (1926–1998)
     Arabesque for alto saxophone, viola and piano, Op. 55 (1985) or orchestra (1991); Éditions Alphonse Leduc
     Aria for violin or viola and piano, Op. 69 (1991)
     Barcarolle for viola and piano, Op. 74 (1992); Editions Combre
     Boston for viola (or violin) and piano, Op. 73 (1992)
     Spleen for viola and piano or chamber orchestra, Op. 63 (1990); Éditions Gérard Billaudot
 Ivan Vincze (b. 1930)
     Duett for violin and viola (1999); Edition Samfundet
     GMEOG for viola and cello (2000); Edition Samfundet
 Carl Vine (b. 1954)
     Miniature I "Peace" for solo viola (1973); Australian Music Centre
     Miniature II for 2 violas (1974); Australian Music Centre
 Nicholas Vines (b. 1976)
     The Underside Revealed for solo viola and string ensemble (1996); Australian Music Centre
 Giulio Viozzi (1912–1984)
     Sonata for viola and piano (1966); Edizioni Suvini Zerboni
     Trio for flute, viola and harp (1960); Edizioni Musicali G. Zanibon
 Nicola Visalli (b. 1968)
     Shafaqa for violin and viola
 Dan Visconti (b. 1982)
     Hard-Knock Stomp for viola solo (2000)
 Fabi Vitaček – Фабий Евгеньевич Витачек (1910–1983)
     Theme and Variations for viola and piano, Op. 7 (1938);  (State Music Publishing House)
 Marius Vitetta
     Etude Caprice No. 1 in E minor for viola and piano (1942); Joseph Patelson Music House
 Berthe di Vito-Delvaux (1915–2005)
     Sonata for viola and piano, Op. 60 (1955); CeBeDeM
 Jāzeps Vītols (1863–1948)
     Récit for viola or cello and piano, Op. 14 (1894); M.P. Belaieff
 Mario Vittoria (1911–1984)
     Anacoluthe, Triptyque for viola and orchestra (1974); original version for orchestra; Éditions françaises de musique-Technisonor; Editions Gérard Billaudot 
 Marina Vlad (b. 1949)
     Natură moartă V (Still Life V) for viola solo (1999)
 Ulpiu Vlad (b. 1945)
     Alb şi rezonanţe (White and Resonances) for viola and tape (2006)
     Flori şi rezonanţe (Flowers and Resonances), Trio for saxophone, viola and piano (2005)
     Lumina rezonanţelor albastre II (The Light of Blue Resonances II) for viola and tape (2005)
     Peisaj înflorit (Blooming Landscape) for viola solo (1999)
     Schiţă II (Sketch II) for viola solo (1975)
 Jan van Vlijmen (1935–2004)
     Faithful for viola solo (1984); Donemus
 Yassen Vodenitcharov (b. 1964)
     Étincelles (Sparks) for flute, viola and harp (2000); Éditions Musicales Européennes; United Music Publishers
     Les songes du papillon (Butterfly Dreams), Sérénade for viola, guitar and trombone (2001); Éditions Musicales Européennes; United Music Publishers
     Litanie II for viola solo (2000); United Music Publishers
 Fritz Voegelin (1943–2020)
     Fantasie for organ, viola and string orchestra (1976); Editions BIM
     Intermezzo Scherzoso for viola and chamber orchestra (1975); Editions BIM
     Tangencias for viola and double chamber orchestra (1997–1978); Editions BIM
 Pierre Voets (b. 1949)
     Canto for viola solo (2005); CeBeDeM
 Henri Vogel (1845–1900)
     3 Morceaux (3 Pieces) for viola and piano, Op. 1 (1861)
 Roger Vogel (b. 1947)
     Odyssey for viola and piano (2007)
     Sonata for viola and piano (1983); American Composers Alliance
 Wladimir Vogel (1896–1984)
     Kleine Hörformen for viola and piano, VWV 51 (1979); Hug Musikverlage
 Hans Vogt (1911–1992)
     Serenade und Tarantella for viola and chamber ensemble (1986); Bote & Bock
     Sonata for viola and harp (1992); Bote & Bock
     Trio for flute, viola and harp (1951, 1989)
 Dan Voiculescu (1940–2009); 
     Ribattuta for viola solo (1976); see also ribattuta
 Johann Georg Hermann Voigt (1769–1811)
     Concerto in C major for viola and orchestra, Op. 11 (c.1790)
 Alain Voirpy (b. 1955)
     Motum III for viola solo (1981); Henry Lemoine
     Thème for viola and piano (1980); Éditions Choudens
 Altin Volaj (b. 1974)
     For Robert Casadesus for flute, viola and harp (2007)
 Kevin Volans (b. 1949)
     viola:piano for viola and piano (2008); Chester Music
 Robert Volkmann (1815–1883)
     Romanze in E major for cello (or viola) and piano, Op. 7 (1853); arranged by Friedrich Hermann for viola and piano (1891); Breitkopf & Härtel
     Schlummerlied (Lullaby) in A major for viola, cello (or 2 violas) and piano, Op. 76 (1882); Edition Schott; Amadeus-Verlag
 Andrei Volkonsky (1933–2008)
     Sonata for viola and piano, Op. 8 (1955); M.P. Belaieff
 Karel Volniansky – קארל וולניאנסקי – Карел Волнянский (b. 1965)
     Sonatina for viola and harpsichord (1994); Israeli Music Center
 Miroslav Volinsky – Мирослав Волинський, see Wolynskyj, Myroslaw
 Andreas Volpert (1918–2007)
     Suite for viola solo, Op. 11 (1951); Musikverlag Max Heiber
 Alexander Voormolen (1895–1980)
     Sonata for viola and piano (1953); Donemus
 Sláva Vorlová (1894–1973) 
     Fantasie na lidovou píseň z XV. století (Fantasy on a 15th-Century Czech Folk Song) for viola solo, Op. 33 (1953); Český Hudební Fond
     Slovácký koncert (Slovak Concerto) for viola and orchestra, Op. 35 (1954); Český Hudební Fond
 Igor Vorobyov (Igor Vorobev) – Игорь Воробьёв (b. 1965)
     Sonata for viola and piano (2001); Kompozitor
 Friedrich Voss (b. 1930)
     Variationen (Variations) for viola (or cello) solo (1962–1963); Breitkopf & Härtel
 Emil Votoček (1872–1950)
     Fantasie for viola and piano (1943)
      (3 Ballatines) for viola and piano (published 1945); Hudební Matice Umělecké Besedy
     Suite for viola and piano
 Alfredo Votta (b. 1980)
     Andante svolon for viola solo, Op. 11 (2000)
 František Vrána (1914–1975)
     Concerto for viola and orchestra, Op. 38 (1964); Český Hudební Fond
     Concertino for viola and orchestra, Op. 21 (1944); Český Hudební Fond
     Sonatina for viola and piano (1940); Panton, Praha; Český Hudební Fond
 Antonín Vranický (1761–1820)
     Cassation in F major for 5 violas or 4 violas and bassoon; Rarities for Strings Publications; Amadeus Verlag
     Concerto in C major for 2 violas and orchestra; Friedrich Hofmeister Verlag
 Pavel Vranický (1756–1808)
     3 Sonatas (Duos) for violin and viola; Amadeus Verlag
 Aleksandra Vrebalov (b. 1970)
     Duo Uran for clarinet and viola (1996)
     Souls, Boats Traveling for flute, viola, harp and prerecorded sounds (2012)
     Spell No. 7 (after Bach’s Cello Suite No. 5), for viola solo (2016); Composers Edition
     Vladimir Trio for flute, violin and viola (1997, revised 2004)
 Max Vredenburg (1904–1976)
     Lamento in F major for viola and piano (1952); Donemus
 Samo Vremšak (1930–2004)
     Suite for viola and piano (1960); Društvo Slovenskih Skladateljev
     Šest pesmi (6 Songs) for voice, viola and piano (1967); Društvo Slovenskih Skladateljev
 Victor Vreuls (1876–1944)
     Poême in E major for cello (or viola) and orchestra, Op. 3 (1900); version with piano (1904); Éditions de L'Art Belge; Bosworth & Co.
 Klaas de Vries (b. 1944)
     Tegen de tijd, Elegie for viola solo (1998); Donemus
 Roger Vuataz (1898–1988)
     Ballade for viola and piano, Op. 113 (1960); Hug Musikverlage
 Alexander Vustin (1943–2020)
     In Memoriam Grigory Frid for viola and piano (2014)
 Ladislav Vycpálek (1882–1969)
     Duo for violin and viola, Op. 20 (1929); Hudební Matice Umělecké Besedy; Český Hudební Fond
     Suite for viola solo, Op. 21 (1929); Hudební Matice Umělecké Besedy; Český Hudební Fond

W
 Louis van Waefelghem (1840–1908)
     Soir d'automne (Autumn Evening), Melody for viola d'amore or viola and piano or harp (1903)
 Jean-Pierre Waelbroeck (b. 1954)
     Pièce de Fantaisie No. 1 for clarinet and viola (2007)
     Sonata No. 1 for viola and piano (2006)
     Sonata No. 2 for viola and piano (2007–2008)
     Sonatina for viola and cello (2007)
 Hendrik Waelput (1845–1885)
     Andante cantabile for 4 violas; American Viola Society Publications
 Oliver Waespi (b. 1971)
     Pulse, Sonata for viola and piano (2006)
 Andrew Waggoner (b. 1960)
     Collines parmi étoiles... (Hills among Stars...) for viola solo (2003)
     Duo for violin and viola (1985); American Composers Alliance
     Elle s'enfuit (Encore-Fugue) for viola and piano (2008)
     Story-Sonata for viola and piano (1990); American Composers Alliance
 Alfred Wagner (1918–1995)
     Scherzo espagnol for viola and piano (1987); Sirius; Heinrichshofen's Verlag
 Richard Wagner (1813–1883)
     Träume (1857) from Wesendonck Lieder, WWV 91; transcription for viola and piano by William Primrose
 Rune Wahlberg (1910–1999)
     Sonata for cello or viola and piano (1983); Swedish Music Information Centre
 Daniel Waitzman (b. 1943)
     Sonata in D minor for viola and piano or harpsichord (2008)
 Adam Walaciński (1928–2015)
     Modyfikacje (Modifications) for viola and piano (1960)
     Canzona for solo viola, piano and formulated tape (1966)
 Eugène Walckiers (1793–1866)
     Sonata in E major for violin (or viola) and piano, Op. 91
 Stanley Walden (b. 1932)
     Fancy 3 for viola and double bass (and large tam-tam) (1977); Musikedition Nymphenburg 2001
 Ernest Walker (1870–1949)
     Romance in B for viola (or clarinet) and piano, Op. 9 (1898); Joseph Williams
     Sonata in C major for viola and piano, Op. 29 (1897); Edition Schott (published 1912)
     Variations on an Original Theme for viola and piano (1907); Novello
 George Walker (1922–2018)
     Sonata for viola and piano (1989); MMB Music
 Gwyneth Walker (b. 1947)
     Sonata for viola and piano (1982); MMB Music
 William Wallace (b. 1933)
     Concertino for viola and chamber orchestra (2002); Canadian Music Centre
     Concerto for viola and orchestra (1962); Canadian Music Centre
     Heortasis for viola solo (1974); Canadian Music Centre
     Intermezzo for viola and chamber orchestra (2001); Canadian Music Centre
     Sonata for viola and piano (1959); Berandol Music; Canadian Music Centre
 Errollyn Wallen (b. 1958)
     Five Postcards for violin and viola (2010)
     Lavinia for viola solo (2021)
     Rapture for viola and piano (1998)
     Romeo Turn for viola, cello and double bass (1990); Edition Peters
 Peter Wallin (b. 1964)
     Sonata No. 1 for viola and piano, Op. 198 (2011)
 Léopold Wallner (1847–1913)
     Berceuse in A major for viola and piano (1909)
     Fantaisie de Concert in D minor for viola and piano or orchestra (1879)
     Rêverie for viola and piano
     Rhapsodie russe in B major for viola and piano (1909)
     Romance for viola and piano
     Suite polonaise for viola and piano (1896)
 Rolf Walss (1927–2007)
     Duo for viola and large gong (1989)
     7 Miniatures for 2 violins and viola (1966)
     Sonatina for viola solo (1988)
 Stefan Johannes Walter (b. 1968)
     Das Hirn ist voll (The Brain Is Full) for viola solo (1992); Edition Dohr
 David Walther (b. 1974)
     And Then There Was a Shark for flute, viola and harp (2009); Fatrock Ink Music Publishers
     Philadelphia Park for viola and piano (2016); Fatrock Ink Music Publishers
     Three Movements for Viola Choir for 12 violas (2010); Fatrock Ink Music Publishers
     A Two for One Trio for flute, viola and harp (2004); Fatrock Ink Music Publishers
 Richard Henry Walthew (1872–1951)
     A Mosaic in Ten Pieces (with Dedication) for clarinet (or viola) and piano (1900)
     Regret and Conversation Galante for viola and piano (1918); Boosey & Hawkes
     Serenade-Sonata in F minor for viola and piano (1925); Joseph Williams
     Sonata in D for viola and piano (1938); Stainer & Bell
     Suite in F for clarinet (or viola) and piano (1899)
 William Walton (1902–1983)
     Concerto in A minor for viola and orchestra (1928–1929); Oxford University Press
 Leopold Matthias Walzel (1902–1970)
     Duo "Six Moments musicaux" for viola and cello, Op. 31 (1962); Verlag Doblinger
     Sonata Ariosa for viola and piano, Op. 30 (1960); Verlag Doblinger
     Fünf Bagatellen (5 Bagatelles) for viola and double bass, Op. 34 (1963); Verlag Doblinger
 Johann Baptist Wanhal (1739–1813)
     Concerto in C major for viola and orchestra
     Concerto in F major for viola and orchestra (c.1785); original for bassoon and orchestra (c.1780); transcription by the composer; Verlag Doblinger
     Sonata in E major for viola and piano; first published in 1973
     Sonata in C major for viola and harpsichord, Op. 5 No. 1
     Sonata in D major for viola and harpsichord, Op. 5 No. 2
     Sonata in F major for viola and harpsichord, Op. 5 No. 3
     Sonata in C major for viola and harpsichord, Op. 5 No. 4
 Robert Ward (1917–2013)
     Arioso and Tarantelle for viola and piano (1954); Highgate Press, Galaxy Music
 David Ward (b. 1941)
     Concerto for viola and orchestra (1997); Vanderbeek & Imrie; Scottish Music Centre
     In Memoriam Simon, Concertino for viola within a string quartet (1989); Vanderbeek & Imrie; Scottish Music Centre
 David Ward-Steinman (1936–2015)
     Cinnabar for viola and piano (1991); Merion Music; Theodore Presser Company
     Cinnabar, Concerto for viola and string orchestra with percussion and piano (or celeste) (1991–1993); Merion Music; Theodore Presser Company
 Harry Waldo Warner (1874–1945)
     A Valse Caprice for violin (or viola) and piano, Op. 20 No. 6 (1927); Carl Fischer
 Elinor Remick Warren (1900–1991)
     Poem for viola with piano (1932); Carl Fischer
 Rodney Waschka II (b. 1958)
     Six Folksongs from an Imaginary Country for viola solo (2003)
 Gary Washburn  (b. 1946)
     The Breathless Feather for solo viola (1973); Seesaw Music
     Zeitdehner for viola and percussion (1973); Seesaw Music
 Wilhelm Joseph von Wasielewski (1822–1895)
     Notturno in B major for violin (or viola, or cello) and piano, Op. 21 (published 1892)
     Herbstblumen (Autumn Flowers), 9 mittelschwere Stücke (9 Intermediate Pieces) for violin or viola and piano, Op. 30 (published 1892)
 Alex Wasserman – אלכס וסרמן (b. 1963)
     Concerto for viola and chamber orchestra (1992); Israel Music Institute
     Concerto Grosso for 3 violas (2004)
     Last Songs for alto and viola (2007); words by Leah Goldberg
     Partita for viola solo (2003)
     Sonata for viola and piano (2002); Israel Music Institute
 Toshiya Watanabe – 渡辺俊哉 (b. 1974)
     Aria (アリア) for viola solo (2008)
     Blink (ブリンク) for viola and piano (2007)
     Mitsu no ne no hibiku kagiri ni (密の根のひびくかぎりに) for soprano and viola (2008)
 Graham Waterhouse (b. 1962)
     Duo for viola and cello (1988)
     Karla Duo for violin and viola, or viola and cello (1985); Musikverlag Varner
     Sonata ebraica (Hebrew Sonata) for viola and piano (2012–2013)
     4 Epigraphe nach Escher (Four Epigraphs after Escher) for viola, heckelphone and piano, Op. 35 (1995); Friedrich Hofmeister Musikverlag
 Adolf Waterman (1886–1966)
     Sonata for viola and piano, Op. 19
 Huw Watkins (b. 1976)
     Double Concerto for viola, cello and orchestra (2004–2005); Edition Schott
     Fantasy for viola and piano (2006); Edition Schott
     Miniatures for viola and piano (2009); Edition Schott
     Speak Seven Seas for clarinet, viola and piano (2011); Edition Schott
 Melia Watras (b. 1969)
     Liquid Voices for violin and viola (2013)
     Photo by Mikel for viola solo (2012)
     Prelude for viola solo (2014)
     Sonata for viola solo (2012)
 Anthony Watson (1933–1973)
     Sonata for solo viola (1969); University of Otago Press; SOUNZ Centre for New Zealand Music
 Walter Watson (1933–2014)
     Lyric Piece for viola and piano (1971); Ludwig Music Publishing
 Alexandr Waulin (1894–1976)
     Sonata for viola and piano; Český Hudební Fond
 John Weaver (1937–2021)
     3 Chorale Preludes for viola and organ (2009)
     Concert Piece for viola and organ (2003)
 John Webb (b. 1969)
     Here's Fine Rosemary, Sage and Thyme for viola solo (1994); Corda Music Publications
     Hop-bodee-boody's Last Will and Testament for soprano, 4 violas and harpsichord (1998); British Music Information Centre
     Into His Marvellous Light for choir, solo viola and organ (1997); British Music Information Centre
 Ben Weber (1916–1979)
     Chorale and Variations for viola and piano, Op. 18 (1943)
     Rhapsodie Concertante for viola and small orchestra, Op. 47 (1957); Mobart Music Publications
 Bedřich Diviš Weber (1766–1842)
     6 Duos faciles et récréatifs for viola and piano, Op. 18 (published 1890)
 Carl Maria von Weber (1786–1826)
     Andante e Rondo ongarese (Andante and Hungarian Rondo) in C minor for viola and orchestra, Op. 35, J. 79 (1809)
     Variationen über das österreichische Volkslied "A Schüsserl und a Reind'rl" (Variations on the Austrian Folk Song "A Schüsserl und a Reind'rl") in C major for viola and orchestra, J. 49 (1806)
 Friedrich Weber (1819–1909)
     Six duos faciles et récréatifs (6 Easy and Refreshing Duos) for viola (or cello) and piano, Op. 18 (1888)
 Katharina Weber (b. 1958)
     Ankunft-Abkunft for viola solo (1997)
 John Weeks (b. 1934)
     Duologue for viola and guitar, Op. 45 (1984); Scottish Music Centre
 Anna Weesner (b. 1965)
     Flexible Parts for viola and piano (2008)
 Arthur Wegelin (1908–1995)
     Fibre Webs (Veselweefsels) for violin, viola and piano, Op. 16 (1972)
     Quatrain (Kwatryn), Concert Piece for viola and piano, Op. 68b (1990)
     Sonata for viola and piano, Op. 67 (1987)
 Hieronymus Weickmann (1825–1895)
     Fantasie in F major for cello or viola and piano (1884)
     Gebet in D major for viola and piano (c.1879)
     Nachtlied und Wiegenlied (Nocturne and Lullaby) for viola and piano, Op. 4 (1890)
 Adolf Weidig (1867–1931)
     Kleines Trio (Little Trio) in D minor for violin, viola and piano, Op. 9 (1893)
 Karl Weigl (1881–1949)
     Sonata in B major for viola and piano, Op. 38 (1939); John Markert & Co.; American Composers Alliance
 Vally Weigl (1894–1982)
     Black Arch of the Night for voice and clarinet or viola (1979); American Composers Alliance
     Enigma for flute, viola and harp (or piano) (1979); American Composers Alliance
     Hoffnungsschimmer (Glimpse of Hope) for alto or baritone, viola and piano (1937); American Composers Alliance
     How Many Nights for voice, viola and piano (1975); American Composers Alliance
     Nightfall in the Mountains for voice, viola (or violin) and piano (1975); American Composers Alliance
     Old Time Burlesque for cello (or viola) and piano (1952); American Composers Alliance
     Playthings of the Wind for baritone, mezzo-soprano, clarinet or viola and piano (1978); words by Carl Sandburg
     Prelude for Three for flute, viola and harp
     Regennacht (Rain at Night) for alto or baritone, viola and piano (1972); words by Hermann Hesse; American Composers Alliance
     Songs from "No Boundary" for voice, violin or viola and piano (1963); words by Lenore Marshall; American Composers Alliance
     Three Dialogues for flute (or violin) and viola (or clarinet) (1979–1980); American Composers Alliance
     Trialogues for flute, viola and harp (or piano, or harpsichord) (1978); American Composers Alliance
 Max Weil (1902–1950)
     Concertino for viola and orchestra (1932)
     Sonata Orientale for viola and piano (1950)
 Ernest Weiller (1863–1944)
     Au pied de la croix, Adagio for violin, or viola, or cello and piano (1926); Éditions Durand
     Largo for violin, or viola, or cello and piano; Edition Combre
     Malagueña: Danse espagnole for violin or viola, string orchestra (or piano) and castanets; Enoch & Cie.; Éditions Durand
     Prière for viola and piano, Op. 280; Enoch & Cie.
     Rêve for violin or viola and piano; Enoch & Cie.; Éditions Durand
     Sicilienne for violin, or viola, or cello and piano, Op. 307; Edition Combre
     Souffrance: Mélodie for violin, or viola, or cello and piano (or string quintet); Enoch & Cie.; Éditions Durand
 Mieczysław Weinberg (1919–1996)
     Sonata for clarinet (or viola) and piano, Op. 28 (1945); Peermusic Classical
     Sonata No. 1 for viola solo, Op. 107 (1971); Peermusic Classical
     Sonata No. 2 for viola solo, Op. 123 (1978); Peermusic Classical
     Sonata No. 3 for viola solo, Op. 135 (1982); Peermusic Classical
     Sonata No. 4 for viola solo, Op. 136 (1983); Peermusic Classical
     Trio for flute, viola and harp (or piano), Op. 127 (1979); Peermusic Classical
 László Weiner (1916–1944)
     Concerto for flute, viola, piano and string orchestra (1941?); Zeneműkiadó Vállalat; Editio Musica Budapest
     Duo for violin and viola (1939); Zeneműkiadó Vállalat; Editio Musica Budapest
     Sonata for viola and piano (1939?); Zeneműkiadó Vállalat; Editio Musica Budapest
 Leó Weiner (1885–1960)
     Ballade in B minor for clarinet (or viola) and piano, Op. 8 (1911); Rózsavölgyi & Co.; Masters Music Publications
     Peregi verbunk (Recruiting Dance from Pereg), Hungarian Dance for clarinet (or violin, or viola) and piano, Op. 40 (1951); Editio Musica Budapest
 Stanley Weiner (1925–1991)
     Concerto for viola and orchestra, Op. 78 (1979)
     Concerto da Camera for viola and string orchestra, Op. 104
     Duo Concertant for violin and viola, Op. 49 (1973); Verband Deutscher Musikerzieher und Konzertierender Künstler
     Elegie and Rondo for viola and organ, Op. 90
     Sonata in G minor for viola and piano, Op. 80 (1981); N. Simrock
     Sonata for viola solo, Op. 17 (1971); MCA Music
     3 Sonatinas for viola solo, Op. 70 (1977); Bote & Bock
     Sonatina for 2 violas, Op. 77
 Justus Weinreich (1858–1927)
     Serenade in D major for violin and viola (1918)
     3 Duets for 2 violas, Op. 5 (1901)
     3 Suites for viola solo (1894); Amadeus Verlag
 Max von Weinzierl (1841–1898)
     Serenade: Nachtstück (Night Piece) for 4 violas (or 3 violas and cello), Op. 34 (1883); Walter Wollenweber
 John Weinzweig (1913–2006)
     Belaria for viola solo (1992); Canadian Music Centre
     Tremologue for viola solo (1987); Canadian Music Centre
 Judith Weir (b. 1954)
     The Alps for soprano, clarinet and viola (1992); words by Emily Dickinson; Chester Music
     St. Agnes for viola and cello (2006); Chester Music
 Arthur Weisberg (1931–2009)
     Birthday Piece for viola and bassoon (1991)
     Piece for viola solo (1984); American Composers Alliance
 Elliot Weisgarber (1919–2001)
     Concerto for viola and string orchestra (1957); Canadian Music Centre
 Julius Weismann (1879–1950)
     Kammermusik (Chamber Music) for flute, viola and piano, Op. 86 (published 1952); Süddeutscher Musikverlag
     Kammermusik (Chamber Music) for viola and piano, Op. 88 (1936); Edition Gravis
     Sonata for viola solo, Op. 149 (1945); Edition Gravis
     Thema, Variationen und Gigue (Theme, Variations and Gigue) for viola and piano, Op. 146 (1943); Edition Gravis
 Adolph Weiss (1891–1971)
     Ode to the West Wind for baritone, viola and piano (1945); Composers Facsimile Edition; American Composers Alliance
     Passacaglia for horn and viola (1942); Composers Facsimile Edition; American Composers Alliance
     Sonata da Camera for flute and viola (1930); New Music Edition; American Music Center
     Trio for clarinet, viola and cello (1948); Composers Facsimile Edition; American Composers Alliance
 Ferdinand Weiss (1933–2022)
     Kammersonate (Chamber Sonata) for flute, viola and guitar (1959) or for viola and cello (1965); Music Information Centre Austria
     Musica brevis II for flute, violin and viola (1978); Music Information Centre Austria
     Serenade for flute, viola nd cello (1961); Music Information Centre Austria
     Sonata for viola and piano (1958); Music Information Centre Austria
 Manfred Weiss (b. 1935)
     5 Expressionen for viola and piano (1996)
     Memento for viola solo (2002)
     4 Miniaturen for viola and double bass (2006); Bellmann Musikverlag
     10 Papillons for viola solo (2011); Bellmann Musikverlag
 Daniel Weissberg (b. 1954)
     Duett for clarinet and viola (1992–1997); Édition Musicale Suisse
 Svea Welander (1898–1985)
     Sonatina for viola and piano (1945); Swedish Music Information Centre
 Waldemar Welander (1899–1984)
     Sonatina for viola and piano (1949); Swedish Music Information Centre
 Peter Welffens (1924–2003)
     Concertino for viola, cello and string orchestra (1959); CeBeDeM
 Karl-Erik Welin (1934–1992)
     Fyra bagateller (Four Bagatelles) for viola and cello (1957); STIM; Swedish Music Information Centre
 Egon Wellesz (1885–1974)
     Präludium (Prelude) for viola solo, Op. 112 (1971); Ludwig Doblinger
     Rhapsody for viola solo, Op. 87 (1959, 1962); Ludwig Doblinger
 Martin Wendel (b. 1925)
     Concerto for viola and chamber orchestra, Op. 11 (1958, 1978); Édition Musicale Suisse
     Fragment for oboe and viola, Op. 32b (1996)
     Musik for viola and piano, Op. 56 (1991); Édition Musicale Suisse
     Railways, Trio for clarinet, viola and piano, Op. 30 (1975–1982); Édition Musicale Suisse
     Trio for flute, viola and harp, Op. 8 (1956); Édition Musicale Suisse
 Marcel Wengler (b. 1946)
     Concerto for viola and orchestra (1997)
 Émile Wenner (1845–after 1908)
     Chanson d'avril for violin or viola and piano (or string orchestra), Op. 22
     Nocturne for violin or viola and piano, Op. 16
     2 Pièces (Caprice; Introduction et Gavotte) for viola and piano, Op. 13 (1885)
 Alexander Weprik (1899–1958) – see Alexander Veprik (Александр Моисеевич Веприк)
 Lars Werdenberg (b. 1979)
     5 Notturni (5 Nocturnes) for viola solo (2003); Édition Musicale Suisse
 Felix Werder (1922–2012)
     Fractured Fancies for viola, piano and percussion (1984); Australian Music Centre
     Kabbalah for viola solo (1981); Australian Music Centre
     Out of Voronezh for viola and  guitar (1994); Australian Music Centre
     Psalm for viola and piano, Op. 14 (1954); Australian Music Centre
     Renunciation for viola, percussion and orchestra (1987); Australian Music Centre
 Manfred Werder (b. 1965)
     viola 1997 for viola solo (1997)
 Eberhard Werdin (1911–1991)
     5 Bratschen-Duette (5 Viola Duets) for 2 violas (1988); Verlag Doblinger
     Divertimento for viola solo (1979); Möseler Verlag
     Divertimento for alto recorder and viola (1986); Verlag Doblinger
     Duo for viola and cello, Op. 126 (1984); Verlag Doblinger
     Greensleeves-Variationen for viola and piano (1984); Verlag Doblinger
     Senioren-Duo for violin and viola, Op. 77 (1987); Verlag Doblinger
     Serenata Concertante for viola and string orchestra; Möseler Verlag
     Sonatine No. 2 for viola and piano (1981); Möseler Verlag
     Vier Bagatellen (4 Bagatelles) for viola and guitar (1984); Verlag Doblinger
 Oskar Wermann (1840–1906)
     Zwei Vortragsstücke (2 Pieces) for viola and organ (or harmonium or piano), Op. 81 (1893)
 Richard Wernick (b. 1934)
     Cadenzas and Variations I for viola and piano (1967); Theodore Presser Company
     Concerto "Do Not Go Gentle" for viola and orchestra (1986); Theodore Presser Company
 Martin Wesley-Smith (1945–2019)
     Doublets 2 for viola, live electronics and tape (1987); Australian Music Centre
 Christian Wilhelm Westerhoff (1763—1806)
     Concerto No. 1 in G major for viola and orchestra
     Concerto No. 2 in C major for viola and orchestra
     Concerto No. 3 in C major for viola and orchestra
 Wilfried Westerlinck (b. 1945)
     Bicinium for viola and cello (1970); CeBeDeM
 Helmut Westermann (1895–1967)
     Konzertante Musik (Concertante Music) in A minor for viola and string orchestra, Op. 34 (1958); N. Simrock
 Peter Wettstein (b. 1939)
     Kammermusik (Chamber Music) for oboe, viola and harpsichord (1966–1968); Jecklin & Co.
     Sieben Märchenbilder (7 Fairy Tale Pictures) for flute, viola and guitar (1989); Jecklin & Co.
 Johannes Weyrauch (1897–1977)
     Herzliebster Jesu, was hast du verbrochen (Alas, Dear Lord, What Law Then Hast Thou Broken), Sonata for viola and organ (1932); Hänssler
 Paul W. Whear (1925–2021)
     Sonata "The Briefcase" for viola and piano (1981); Ludwig Music
 Lawrence Wheeler (b. 1949)
     12 Caprices for viola solo, Op. 1 (1970)
 Donald Wheelock (b. 1940)
     Sonata for viola and piano (1992)
 Graham Whettam (1927–2007)
     Ballade hébraïque for viola and orchestra (1999); Meriden Music
     Concerto for viola and orchestra, Op. 16 (1954); de Wolfe
     Romanza [No. 1] for viola solo (1993); Meriden Music
     Romanza No. 2 for viola solo (2000); Meriden Music
     Serenade for viola (or clarinet) and guitar (1981); Meriden Music
 James Whitbourn (b. 1963)
     The Canticles of Mary and Simeon: Magnificat and Nunc Dimittis (Eboracum) for mixed chorus, viola and organ (2011); Chester Music
     Luminosity, Cantata-Meditation for double mixed chorus, viola, tanpura, tam-tam and organ (2007); Chester Music
 David Ashley White (b. 1944)
     Homages for medium voice, viola and piano (1983); words by John Donne and George Herbert; ECS Publishing
 Frances White (b. 1960)
     The Book of Roses and Memory for viola, narrator and electronics (2008)
     Like the Lily for viola, double bass and tape (1999)
     A Veil Barely Seen for viola and tape (2000)
 John White (b. 1936)
     Incantation for viola solo (1987); Oxford University Press; British Music Information Centre
 Michael White (1931–2022)
     Concerto for viola and orchestra (1994)
 Gillian Whitehead (b. 1941)
     Haiku for soprano, viola and piano (1995); Australian Music Centre; Centre for New Zealand Music
     Lament for baritone, oboe and viola (1964)
     Moonstone for viola and piano (1976); Price Milburn Music; Centre for New Zealand Music
     Ricercare for viola solo (1976); Price Milburn Music; Centre for New Zealand Music
     These Isles Your Dream for mezzo-soprano, viola and piano (1983); Australian Music Centre; Centre for New Zealand Music
 Matthew Whiteside (b. 1988)
     Ulation for viola and live electronics (2012); Contemporary Music Centre Ireland
 Michael Whiticker (b. 1954)
     If Buifs for viola solo (1981); Australian Music Centre
 Kate Whitley (b.1989)
     Concerto for viola and orchestra (2010)
 William G. Whittaker (1876–1944)
     Suite for viola and piano (1932); Scottish Music Centre
 Matthew Whittall (b. 1975)
     The Heaven That Dwells So Deep, Concerto for viola and orchestra (2010); Finnish Music Information Centre
 Charles Whittenberg (1927–1984)
     Set for Two, Divertimento for viola and piano (1962)
 Ian Whyte (1901–1961)
     Air for viola and string orchestra; Scottish Music Centre
     Highland Melody "Och Is Ochan Mo Charamh Mar Dheirich Do Thearlach" for viola and string orchestra; Scottish Music Centre
     Sweet Allander Stream, Poem for small orchestra with soli violas (1955?); Scottish Music Centre
 Paul Wiancko (b. 1983)
     American Haiku, Duo for viola and cello (2015)
     Sonata for viola and piano (2016)
 Jörg Widmann (b. 1973)
     Concert for viola and orchestra (2015); Schott Music
 Ernst Widmer (1927–1990)
     Cosmofonia IV for flute, viola and harp, Op. 164 (1988)
     Mobile 1 for viola and piano, Op. 85 (1973–1975); Musik Verlag Nepomuk
     Trio Basso for viola, cello and double bass, Op. 171 (1988)
 Charles-Marie Widor (1844–1937)
     Andante from the Organ Symphony No. 8 for viola d'amore or viola and piano, Op. 42 No. 4 (1887); transcription by Louis van Waefelghem (1895?)
 Jan Michał Wieczorek (1904–1980)
     Scherzo for viola and piano (1972); Polskie Wydawnictwo Muzyczne
 Beth Wiemann (b. 1959)
     Canopy for clarinet, viola and piano (1988, 1994); American Composers Alliance
     Crows Everywhere Are Equally Black for viola, clarinet and DVD (2008); American Composers Alliance
     Looks Like Rain for (mezzo) soprano, viola and harpsichord (1993); American Composers Alliance
 Jean Wiener (1896–1982)
     Riz et jeux: divertissement impur sur un thème pur (Rice and Games) for viola and piano (1947); Éditions Choudens
 Stéphane Wiener (1922–1998)
     Déchiffrages originaux for viola solo (1985); Éditions Choudens
     6 Études de forme classique for viola solo (1979–1980); Éditions Gérard Billaudot
     5 Études (sur les intervalles) for viola solo (1988); Éditions Choudens
     Mouvements for 2 violas (1979); Éditions Gérard Billaudot
     Sonate en ré (Sonata in D) for viola solo (1965); Éditions Choudens
     Deuxième sonate (Sonata No. 2) for viola solo; Éditions Musicales Européennes
 Henryk Wieniawski (1835–1880)
     Rêverie in F minor for viola and piano (1855, published 1885)
 Jules Wiernsberger (1857–1925)
     Deux cantilènes for viola or violin and piano, Op. 40 (1890)
     Cantilène mélancolique
     Cantilène pastorale
 Menachem Wiesenberg – מנחם ויזנברג (b. 1950)
     Concertino (קונצ'רטינו) for viola and string orchestra (1998, 2020); Israel Music Institute
     Double Concerto (קונצ'רטו כפול) for viola, cello and chamber orchestra (2008); Israel Music Institute
     Like Clay in the Potter's Hand (כי הנה כחומר ביד היוצר) for cello or viola and piano (1994); Israel Music Institute
     Monodialogue (מונודיאלוג), Fantasy for viola solo (1999); choreographic version: Voices: Woman, Man; Schott Music
     Suita Concertante (Encounters IV) (סוויטה קונצ'רטנטה (מפגשים IV)) for clarinet, viola and chamber orchestra (2000, 2006); Israel Music Institute
 Frank Wigglesworth (1918–1996)
     After Summer Music for alto flute, viola and guitar (1983); American Composers Alliance
     Concertino for viola and chamber orchestra (1986); American Composers Alliance
     Duo for oboe and viola (1964); Merion Music; Theodore Presser Company
     Honeysuckle, Sonata for solo viola (1984); American Composers Alliance
     Serenade for flute, viola and guitar (1958); American Composers Alliance
     Sound Piece for viola and piano (1948); American Composers Alliance
 Frans Wigy (1911–1989)
     Capriccio for viola solo (1971); Éditions J. Maurer
     Sonata for viola solo (1956); Éditions J. Maurer
 Joseph Wihtol (1863–1948), see Jāzeps Vītols
 Johannes Hendrik van Wijngaarden (1912–1991)
     Drie korte impressies (3 Short Impressions) for viola and piano (1939)
     Fantasie for viola and piano (1940)
     Sonata for viola and piano (1951)
     Tweede Preludium en Fuga (Prelude and Fugue No. 2) in F major for viola and piano (1937)
 Jürgen Wilbrandt (1922–2019)
     Duette I, 8 Canons for oboe and viola (1990); Verlag Neue Musik
 Philip Wilby (b. 1949)
     Parables for viola and piano (1988); Chester Music
 Jacques Wildberger (1922–2006)
     Diaphanie: Fantasia super "Veni creator spiritus" et Canones diversi super "Nun bitten wir den heiligen Geist" for viola solo (1986); Hug Musikverlage
     Notturno for viola and piano (1–2 little Japanese temple bells ad libitum) (1990); Hug Musikverlage
 Alec Wilder (1907–1980)
     Sonata for viola and piano (1965)
 Margaret Lucy Wilkins (b. 1939)
     Suite for Two for violin and viola (1968); Scottish Music Centre
 Christopher Willcock (b. 1947)
     The Frilled Lizard for viola and harp (published 1999); Australian Music Centre
 Martin Willert (b. 1974)
     Love Song for viola solo (2002); STIM; Swedish Music Information Centre
 Adrian Williams (b. 1956)
     Concertino for viola and string orchestra (1988); Éditions Max Eschig
     Tinuviel's Dance for viola and piano (1989); Éditions Max Eschig
     Toccata, Romance and Miniature Variations for viola and piano (1988); Éditions Max Eschig
 Edgar Warren Williams (b. 1949)
     Amoretti for viola and piano (1980); Mobart Music
 Gareth Williams (b. 1977)
     Black Marks on White Paper for viola and piano 4-hands (2007); Contemporary Music Centre Ireland
 Graham Williams (b. 1940)
     Elegy, In Homage to Morton Feldman for solo viola, 2 clarinets and bass clarinet (2008)
     Japanese Fragments for soprano, viola and guitar (1973); Chester Music
     Newton/Bronze for viola and string orchestra (2000)
     Notes from a Time Past for flute, viola and piano (2005)
     Paving the Way for solo viola (2006)
     Scena 1 for viola and piano (1974)
     Serenade for flute, viola and guitar (1981)
     A Song for Christina Rossetti for flute, viola and harp (1994)
     Three Little Pieces for solo viola (1991)
     Through a Glass, Darkly for clarinet, viola and piano (2001)
 John Williams (b. 1932)
     Concerto for viola and orchestra (2009); Hal Leonard
     Duo Concertante for violin and viola (2007); Hal Leonard
 John McLaughlin Williams (b. 1957)
      2 Pieces for viola solo
 John R. Williamson (1929–2015)
     Sonata for viola and piano (1991); British Music Information Centre; Welsh Music Information Centre
 Malcolm Williamson (1931–2003)
     Partita on Themes of Walton for viola solo (1972); Oxford University Press; Joseph Weinberger
 George Balch Wilson (1927–2021)
     Sonata for viola and piano (1952); Éditions Jobert
 Ian Wilson (b. 1964)
     Apparitions for viola (or alto flute) and percussion ensemble (2005); G. Ricordi London
     Četiri kamena (Four Stones) for viola, bass clarinet and accordion (2010); Contemporary Music Centre Ireland
     Mürrische Erde for viola solo (2009); Contemporary Music Centre Ireland
     Spilliaert's Beach for viola and piano (1999); original for alto flute and piano; Universal Edition
     red over black for clarinet, viola and piano (2004); G. Ricordi London
 James Wilson (1922–2005)
     Capriccio for viola solo (2001); Ireland Contemporary Music Centre
     The Christmas Rose for voice and viola (1989); Ireland Contemporary Music Centre
     Concerto ‘For Sarajevo’, Triple Concerto for violin, viola, cello and orchestra, Op. 143 (1996, revised 1998); Ireland Contemporary Music Centre
     Consequences for flute, viola and harp, Op. 169 (2004); Ireland Contemporary Music Centre
     Menorah for viola and orchestra, Op. 123 (1989); Ireland Contemporary Music Centre
     Shadow Play for viola solo, Op. 115a (1988); Ireland Contemporary Music Centre
     Wildwood for soprano and viola, Op. 124 (1990); Ireland Contemporary Music Centre
 Max Wilson (b. 1973)
     Cynosure for viola solo (1997); Scottish Music Centre
 Olly Wilson (1937–2018)
     Concerto for viola and orchestra (1992); G. Schirmer
 Richard Wilson (b. 1941)
     Music for Solo Viola (1988); Peermusic
     Peregrinations for viola and orchestra (2003); Peermusic
     Sonata for viola and piano (1989); Peermusic
 Stanley Wilson (1899–1953)
     Double Concerto for violin, viola and orchestra (1935)
     2 Pieces for viola and piano
 Thomas Wilson (1927–2001)
     Concerto for viola and orchestra (1987); Queensgate Music
 Andrew Wilson-Dickson (b. 1946)
     digital sonata for viola and digital piano (2004–2005)
     Sonatine Gaillacoise for clarinet and viola
 Chris Wind (b. 1957)
     Lament for viola solo (1984); Canadian Music Centre
     Piece for viola and piano (1985); Canadian Music Centre
     Pieces for flute and viola (1985); Canadian Music Centre
 Lothar Windsperger (1885–1935)
     Ode in C minor for viola solo, Op. 13 No. 2 (1919); Edition Schott
     Sonata for viola solo, Op. 42 (1930); Edition Schott
 Mark Winges (b. 1951)
     Discover & Reveal for alto, viola and piano (2004); words by Denise Levertov
     Diverted Vignettes for viola solo (2012)
     Dusk Music II for alto flute, viola and cello (1989)
     Englyn Forms for viola and cello (1994)
     Night-Voiced for viola and organ, or viola and piano (2 versions) (2011)
     Reciprocal Tapestries for viola, cello and piano (2005)
     San Francisco Stopover for guitar, viola and cello (2006)
 Alexander Winkler (1865–1935)
     Sonata in C minor for viola and piano, Op. 10 (1902)
     Deux Morceaux (2 Pieces) for viola and piano, Op. 31 (1933)
 Walter Winslow (1947–1998)
     Artemisia for viola and piano (1983); American Composers Alliance
 Geoffrey Winters (b. 1928)
     Elegy for a Countryside for horn or viola and string orchestra, Op. 75 (1982); Brett Songs; British Music Information Centre
     Sonata No. 1 for viola and piano, Op. 8 (1955); British Music Information Centre
     Sonata No. 2 for viola and piano, Op. 57 (1978); British Music Information Centre
     Songs and Dances for horn, viola and piano, Op. 74 (1982); Warner Chappell Music
     Tapestry for flute, viola and harp, Op. 85 (1987?); Oxford University Press
 Bruce Wise (1929–2013)
     Duo I for viola and piano (1972)
 Peter Wishart (1921–1984)
     Cassation for violin and viola (1949); Oxford University Press
 Jan Wisse (1921–2008)
     Concerto for viola and orchestra (1948–1949)
     Concerto grosso for violin, viola, cello and woodwind instruments (1998)
 Norbert Wissing (1959–2019)
     Musica No. 8 for viola solo (2006)
     Sonate Musica for saxophone, viola and piano (1996–1997)
 Zbigniew Wiszniewski (1922–1999)
     Duo for flute and viola (1966); Moeck Verlag; Polskie Wydawnictwo Muzyczne
     Trio for oboe, viola and harp (1963); Polskie Wydawnictwo Muzyczne
 Robert Wittmann (1804–?)
     Barcarole in B major for horn (or viola, or cello) and piano, Op. 50 (c.1870)
 Christian Woehr (b. 1951)
     Bachiana for viola solo (1988); Viola World Publications
     Gli altri, Cantata for violas (viola section, 4–40 violas) and orchestra (1995); Andromeda Music
     The Matrimonial Duets for viola and double bass (2007)
 René Wohlhauser (b. 1954)
     CI – IC for flute and viola, Ergon 11 (1985); Édition Musicale Suisse
     Quantenströmung (Quantum Current) for flute, viola and harp, Ergon 23 (1996); Édition Musicale Suisse
 Ernst Wilhelm Wolf (1735–1792)
     Concerto in B major for viola and orchestra; Edition Dohr
     Concerto in F major for viola and orchestra
 Christian Wolff (b. 1934)
     Emma for viola, cello and piano (1988–1989); C.F. Peters
     Malvina for 2 violas (1992); C.F. Peters
     She Had Some Horses for zither and viola (2001)
     Three Pieces for violin and viola (1979–1980); C.F. Peters
     Violist Pieces for viola solo (1997); C.F. Peters
     Violist and Percussionist for viola and percussion (1996); C.F. Peters
 Félicien Wolff (1913–2012)
     Trio for viola (or violin), cello and piano (1945); Éditions Delatour
 Gustav Wolff
     Scheherazade for viola and piano, Op. 25 (1883); original for violin or cello and piano
 Gernot Wolfgang (b. 1957)
     Quiet Time for viola and piano (2008); Doblinger
     3 Short Stories for viola and bassoon (or cello) (2000); Doblinger
 Michael Wolpe – מיכאל וולפה (b. 1960)
     Homage to Paul Ben-Haim No. 2 for viola solo (1987); Israeli Music Center
 Stefan Wolpe (1902–1972)
     Drei kleinere Kanons (3 Little Canons) for viola and cello, Op. 24a (1936); Peer Music
     Piece for Viola Alone, C. 165 (1966); original work for violin; Josef Marx Music Company
 Franz Alfons Wolpert (1917–1978)
     Ritornell for cello (or viola) and piano (1954); Heinrichshofens Verlag
 Max Wolpert (b. 1993)
     Concerto No. 1 "Giants" for viola and orchestra (2015)
     Rocky Ridge for violin or viola solo (2011)
     When Men Wear Swords for violin or viola solo (2016)
 Reinhard Wolschina (b. 1952)
     Canto appassionato for viola and piano (1976); Keturi Musikverlag
     Klangspiele II for viola and 14 instruments (1989); Breitkopf & Härtel
 William Wolstenholme (1865–1931)
     Allegretto in E major, Op. 17 No. 2; arrangement for viola and piano by Lionel Tertis (published 1900); Comus Edition
     Canzona in B major, Op. 12 No. 1 (1893); arrangement for viola and piano by Lionel Tertis; Corda Music Publications
     Die Antwort (The Answer), Op. 13 No. 2; arrangement for viola and piano by Lionel Tertis; Comus Edition
     Die Frage (The Question), Op. 13 No. 1; arrangement for viola and piano by Lionel Tertis; Comus Edition
     Romanza, Op. 17 No. 1; arrangement for viola and piano by Lionel Tertis (published 1900); Comus Edition
 Myroslaw Wolynskyj – Мирослав Михайлович Волинський (b. 1955)
     Sonata in C minor for viola and piano (2010)
 Hugh Wood (1932–2021)
     Michael Berkeley Tribute for viola solo (2004); Chester Music
     Trio for flute, viola and piano, Op. 3 (1961); Universal Edition; Chester Music
     Variations for viola and piano, Op. 1 (1958); Chester Music
 Joseph Wood (1915–2000)
     Double Concerto for viola and piano with Orchestra (1970); American Composers Alliance
     Sonata for viola and piano (1938); American Composers Alliance
 David Wooldridge (1927–1998)
     Concerto for viola and orchestra (1949); Hinchinbroke Music
     Three Diversions for viola solo (1982); Hinchinbroke Music
 Henry Woollett (1864–1936)
     Sonata No. 5 for violin or viola and piano (1922); Éditions Maurice Senart; Éditions Salabert
 John Woolrich (b. 1954)
     Concerto for viola and orchestra (1993); Faber Music
     Envoi for viola and small ensemble (1997); Faber Music
     Three Pieces for viola solo (1993); Faber Music
     Through a Limbeck for viola solo (2002); Faber Music
     To the Silver Bow, Double Concerto for viola, double bass and string orchestra (2014); Faber Music
     Ulysses Awakes for viola and 10 solo strings (1989); Faber Music
 William Wordsworth (1908–1988)
     Conversation Piece for viola and guitar, Op. 113 (1983); Speyside Music Publications
     Four Songs of Shakespeare for high voice, viola and piano, Op. 103 (1977); Scottish Music Centre
     Intermezzo for viola and piano (1935); Scottish Music Centre
     The Solitary Reaper for mixed chorus, viola and piano; Scottish Music Centre
     Sonatina in D for viola and piano (or Guitar), Op. 71 (1961); Scottish Music Centre
     Three Pieces for viola and piano, Op. 93 (1972); Scottish Music Centre
        Prelude
        Elegy
        Scherzo
 Wladimir Woronoff (1903–1980)
     Tripartita for viola and orchestra (1970); CeBeDeM
 Anton Wranitzky (1761–1820) – see Antonín Vranický
 Paul Wranitzky (1756–1808) – see Pavel Vranický
 John Reginald Wray
     Capriccioso for viola and piano (1947); Oxford University Press
     A Simple Suite for viola ensemble (or viola) and piano (1949); Oxford University Press
 Katrina Wreede (b. 1960)
     Bop Caprice I for solo viola (1991)
     Bop Caprice II for solo viola (1992)
     The Children's Garden for soprano, viola and piano (2005)
     Concerto for Improvising Viola and Orchestra (1995)
     Conversation for viola and marimba (1994)
     C-String Blues for viola ensemble (1990)
     Duo for Sunday for 2 violas (1993)
     Event #3 for solo viola and living wind chimes (2000)
     8 Fantasies on Christmas Carols for viola and piano (2000)
     56” of Creep for viola and electronics (2004)
     Groovla for viola and electronics (2005)
     In Praise of August Sundogs for 2 violas, prepared viola and goat toenails (1994) or for 4 violas (1994, revised 2006)
     Invocation #3 for solo viola (1998)
     Lil' Phrygian Rondo for 2 violas (1992)
     Lullaby for viola, hand drum and women's voices (2000)
     Pleasant Melody #1 for viola and piano (1998)
     Romp for solo viola (1996)
     Scenes for viola and harp (2008)
     Shulman Variations for viola and piano (1993)
     Two Waltzes for viola and piano (1994)
     Vincent's Waltz, Jazz Waltz for viola and piano (1991); Vlazville Music; Latham Music
     Violaerobics, a technical workout for violists (1993)
    Violas on a Roll for 2 solo violas and viola ensemble (or 4 violas) (2011); Vlazville Music
 Christopher Wright (b. 1954)
     Spring's Garden for viola and piano (2006)
 Margot Wright (1911–2000)
     Three Northumbrian Folk Songs for viola and piano (1993); SJ Music
 Maurice Wright (b. 1949)
     Five Short Pieces for viola solo (1974); Jerona Music; Music Associates of America; Mobart Music
     Grand Duo for viola and percussion (1985, revised 2000); HoneyRock Press
     A Solo Suite for viola (1987); available from the composer
 Gerhard Wuensch (1925–2007)
     Sonatina for viola and piano, Op. 15 (1964); Canadian Music Centre
 Alexander Wunderer (1877–1955)
     Sonata for viola and piano, Op. 21 (1946); Verlag Doblinger
 Charles Wuorinen (1938–2020)
     Viola Variations for viola solo (2008); Edition Peters
 Anton Würz (1903–1995)
     Sonata in B minor for viola and piano, Op. 46 (1952); Amadeus Verlag
 A. F. Wustrow (ca.1786–1852)
     Duo concertant in B major for viola and piano, Op. 7 (1828)
 Ruth Shaw Wylie (1916–1989)
     Sonata [No. 1] for viola and piano, Op. 16 No. 3 (1954)
 Dann Coriat Wyman (1912–1995)
     Aloneness for viola solo (1974); Seesaw Music
     Ode to the Viola for viola and string orchestra (1973); Seesaw Music
     Sonata for viola and piano (1974); Seesaw Music
 Yehudi Wyner (b. 1929)
     Composition for viola and piano (1987); Associated Music Publishers
 David Wynne (1900–1983)
     Fantasia Concerto for viola and orchestra (1961); Welsh Music Information Centre
     Sonata for viola and piano (1951)
     Sonatina for viola and piano (1946); Welsh Music Information Centre
 Ivan Wyschnegradsky (1893–1979)
     Sonata in One Movement for viola and 2 pianos tuned a quarter-tone apart, Op. 34 (1945–1959)

X
 Iannis Xenakis (1922–2001)
     Embellie for viola solo (1981); Éditions Salabert
 Lorenc Xhuvani (b. 1979)
     Variazioni di valore for viola and electronics (2013); M.A.P. Editions
 Changhui Xu, also Tsang-Houei Hsu – 許常惠 (1929–2001)
     L'Injustice à Tou-O for viola and piano; Collection Panorama: Œuvres Contemporaines, Volume 3; Éditions Gérard Billaudot
 Yi Xu – 徐仪 (b. 1963)
     Miroir / Poussière for viola and 9 instruments (1992); Éditions Musicales Transatlantiques
     Qing for viola solo (2009); Éditions Henry Lemoine

Y
 Aaron Yalom (1918–2002)
     Sephardic Poem in G minor for viola and piano (1947); Edition Kunzelmann
 Izumi Yamada – 山田泉 (1952–1999)
      for viola and orchestra (1994)
      for viola solo (1995); Zen-On Music
 Hiroyuki Yamamoto (b. 1967)
     Textile Texts (テクスタイル・テクスツ) for clarinet and viola (2001)
 Akiko Yamane – 山根明季子 (b. 1982)
     Curiouser and Curiouser! (キュリオーサー＆キュリオーサー！) for viola solo (2011)
     Plastic Babies (プラスチックベイビーズ) for violin, viola and piano (2011)
     Windingly Moving Object β (うねうねとうごくオブジェ β) for viola solo (2009)
 Tsung-Hsien Yang – 楊聰賢 (Congxian Yang) (b. 1952)
     Elegy (悲歌) for viola, string orchestra, harp and percussion (1995)
 James Yannatos (1929–2011)
     Fantasy for viola and piano (1960); Sonory Publications
     Madrigals for flute (or violin) and viola (1981); Sonory Publications
 Gregory Yasinitsky (b. 1953)
     Nocturne & Steam Train for saxophone or viola and piano (2001); Advance Music
 Akio Yasuraoka (b. 1958)
     Offrande (オフランド, Offering) for viola solo (1990); Japan Federation of Composers
      for viola and orchestra (1995–1996)
 Rachel Yatzkan (b. 1968)
     Viola Solo for viola solo (1994); Edition Samfundet
 Mikhail Yermolayev – Михаил Георгиевич Ермолаев (b. 1952) – see Mikhail Kollontay
 Boris Yoffe (b. 1968)
     Gedicht (Poem) for viola solo
     Speech for clarinet, viola and piano
     Symbol for violin and viola
 Elizabeth Younan (b. 1994)
     Fantasia No. 1 for viola solo (2019)
     Microsonata No. 1 for viola and piano (2017) 
     Ollie's Groove for violin or viola (2021)
 David L. Young 
     Travelling for viola solo (1996); Australian Music Centre
 Douglas Young (b. 1947)
     2nd Night Journey under the Sea for viola and 11 strings (1980)
     Slieve League for violin and viola (1983); G. Ricordi
 Toby Young (b. 1990)
     Capriccio for viola solo (2011)
 Rolv Yttrehus (1926–2018)
     Music for Winds, Percussion, and Viola (1961); Mobart Music; American Composers Alliance
 Joji Yuasa (b. 1929)
     Revealed Time (啓かれた時) for viola and orchestra (1986); Schott Japan
     Viola Locus (ヴィオラ・ローカス) for viola solo (1995); Schott Japan
 Sergei Yuferov (1865–?)
     Mélancolie in D minor for viola and orchestra, Op. 43 No. 2 (1910)
 Dan Yuhas – דן יוהס (b. 1947)
     Duo for viola and cello (2005); Israeli Music Center
     Trio for viola, harp and percussion (1995)
     Trio for viola, tuba and piano (2003); Israeli Music Center
 Charles Robert Yuille-Smith (1904–1988)
     Romance for cello (or viola) and piano, Op. 4 (1932); Oxford University Press
 Isang Yun (1917–1995)
     Contemplation for 2 violas (1988); initial title: Stille am See; Bote & Bock
     Duo for viola and piano (1976); Bote & Bock
 Ahmet Yürür (b. 1941)
     Atys for oboe and viola (1978)
     Marifet Süiti for viola solo (1995)
 Benjamin Yusupov (b. 1962)
     Concerto for viola and orchestra (2003); Hans Sikorski; G. Schirmer
     Vocal Cycle by Japanese Poets for voice, viola and piano (1985); Israeli Music Center
     But in Vain for flute, viola and harp, Op. 44 (1997); Hans Sikorski
     Fantasy for viola solo, Op. 16 (1988)
     Kasida on Mourning for viola, piano and celesta, Op. 4 (1982)
     Maximum for violin, viola, flute, harp and orchestra (2003); Hans Sikorski; G. Schirmer
 Carlo Yvon (1798–1854)
     Sonata in F for English horn or viola and piano (1831)

Z
 Frank Zabel (b. 1968)
     Beyond Silence and Despair, 4 Poems for clarinet, viola and piano (2010)
     Doppelkonzert (Double Concerto) for viola, accordion and orchestra (2012)
     Elfentanz und Hexentanz (Elves' Dance and Witches' Dance) for violin and cello (or viola) (1998–2005)
     Halluzinationen (Hallucinations), 5 Sketches for flute, violin and viola (1995)
     Im (Halb-)Dunkeln (In the (Half-)Darkness) for cello (or viola) solo (2003–2005)
     Im (Halb-)Dunkeln II (In the (Half-)Darkness II) for cello (or viola) and live electronics (2010)
     Method Acting for cello (or viola) solo (2008)
     Method Acting II for viola and live electronics (2010–2011)
     Nachtblau for clarinet, viola (or cello) and piano (2010–2011)
     Presto estatico for violin and cello (or viola) (1997–2005)
     Verwerfungen II (Faults II) for viola and accordion (2007)
 Harold Zabrack (1929–1995)
     Two Duets for viola and oboe (1961)
 Mario Zafred (1922–1987)
     Concerto for viola and orchestra (1957); Ricordi
     Elegia in tre tempi for viola and orchestra (1965); Ricordi
     Invenzioni for violin, viola and orchestra (1966); Ricordi
     Sonata in tre tempi for viola solo (1970); Ricordi
 Amir Zaheri (b. 1979)
     Listen to My Voice for mixed chorus, viola (ad libitum) and piano (2011)
     A New Solace for female chorus, viola (ad libitum) and piano (2002)
 Volodymyr Zahortsev – Володимир Миколайович Загорцев (1944–2010)
     Sonata for viola and piano (1979)
 Zdeněk Zahradník (b. 1936)
     Okamžiky (Moments), 3 Pieces for viola and harp (1964); Český Hudební Fond
     Dante a Beatrice, Variační sonata da camera  (Dante and Beatrice, Sonata variato da camera) for viola and cembalino; Český Hudební Fond
 Judith Lang Zaimont (b. 1945)
     Astral – A Mirror Life on the Astral Plane for viola solo (2004); Jeanné Music Publications
     Music for Two for 2 violas (1971); Jeanné Music Publications
 Velislav Zaimov – Велислав Заимов (b. 1951)
     Concerto for 2 violas and orchestra (1998); Union of Bulgarian Composers
     Concerto for violin, viola and orchestra (1994); Union of Bulgarian Composers
     Sonata for viola solo (1991); Union of Bulgarian Composers
     Sonata for viola and cello (1989); Union of Bulgarian Composers
     Sonata for viola and double bass (2000); Union of Bulgarian Composers
     Sonata for violin and viola (1999); Union of Bulgarian Composers
     Trio for clarinet, viola and piano (1998); Union of Bulgarian Composers
     Trio-Sonata for violin, viola and piano (1988); Union of Bulgarian Composers
 E. Zakharov – Э. Захаров
     4 Intermezzi (Четыре интермеццо) for viola solo (1957); Sovetsky Kompozitor
 Joaquim Zamacois (1894–1976)
     Serenada d'hivern for viola and piano (1970); Unión Musical Española
 Sebastián Zambrana
     Miradas Rioplatenses for viola and guitar (2003)
 Evžen Zámečník (1939–2018)
     Duo for violin and viola (1974)
     Duo for 2 violas (1975)
     Elegie na smrt André Bretona (Elegy on the Death of André Breton) for viola and piano (1966)
     Lašské jaro (Lachian Spring), Cantata to texts by Petr Bezruč and Lachian folk poetry for baritone solo, viola solo, mixed chorus and orchestra (1989); Český Hudební Fond
     Ortel samoty (Sentenced to Solitude), Sonata No. 1 for solo viola ("To the Memory of Petr Bezruč") (2006); Alliance Publications; Český Hudební Fond
     Quartet for 4 violas (2003)
     Tři invence ve starém slohu (3 Inventions in an Old Style) for violin and viola (1979)
      Trio for 3 violas (1982); Český Hudební Fond
 Gheorghe Zamfir (b. 1941)
     Amintiri din copilărie (Memories of Childhood) for pan flute and viola (1988)
 Edson Zampronha (b. 1963)
     Perfurando a Linha (Drilling the Line) for viola solo (2002)
 Sławomir Zamuszko (b. 1973)
     Suite for viola solo (1994–1995)
     Ostinati for viola and piano (1995) or viola and accordion (1997)
     Portal 2 for viola, cello and orchestra (1998–1999)
     Portal 3 for solo viola and chamber orchestra (2002) or for viola and piano (2006)
     Concerto for solo viola and orchestra (2009)
 Daniele Zanettovich (b. 1950)
     Cancion antigua for flute, viola (or cello) and harp (2003); Pizzicato Verlag Helvetia
     Sei canzoni andaluse (6 Andalusian Songs) for flute, viola (or cello) and harp (1994, 1997, 2003); Pizzicato Verlag Helvetia
     Stabat Mater for mezzo-soprano, male chorus, viola and orchestra (or organ) (2002); Pizzicato Verlag Helvetia
     Vivaldiana for flute, viola and harp (2004); Pizzicato Verlag Helvetia
 Luigi Zaninelli (b. 1932)
     Two Movements for Unaccompanied Viola/Violin for One Player (1986); Shawnee Press
 Davide Zannoni (b. 1958)
     Boom Box Rondo for viola and piano (1991)
 José Zárate (b. 1972)
     Canto azzurro for viola solo (2006)
     Concerto for viola and orchestra (2014)
     Fantasía for viola and piano (1996)
     Four Poems Lyrics [sic] (Four Lyrical Poems) for viola and cello (2008)
 Inessa Zaretsky (b. 1964)
     Dervishes, 5 Pieces for viola and percussion (2005)
     Fireoptics, Sonata for viola and piano (2001)
     Humoresque for viola solo
     Russian Dances, Suite for viola and piano
     Two Songs for mezzo-soprano, viola (or cello) and piano (2000)
 Anna Zawadzka-Gołosz (b. 1955)
     Poco a poco più for viola and piano (1994); Editio Alto
     Studium ŚWIATŁO-cienia (A Study of Light/Shadow) for flute and viola (2007)
     Trzy myśli na cztery czwarte (Three Thoughts in Four Parts) for flute and viola (2006)	
 Serhiy Zazhitko – Сергій Іванович Зажитько (b. 1962)
     Sonata for viola and piano (1988)
 Julien-François Zbinden (1917–2021)
     Alternances for flute, viola and harp, Op. 88 (1997); Editions BIM
     Poème for viola and string orchestra, Op. 84 (1993–1994); Editions BIM
     Solissimo II for viola solo, Op. 102 (2005); Editions BIM
 Franz Zebinger (b. 1946)
     Chanson pour Dada for viola and piano (2007); Music Information Centre Austria
     Verhext: drei Zauberstücke (Bewitched: 3 Magic Pieces) for viola and piano (2007); Music Information Centre Austria
     Vier Meditationen (4 Meditations) for viola and organ (2003); Music Information Centre Austria
 Ruth Zechlin (1926–2007)
     In Memorian Witold Lutosławski for viola solo (1995); Ries & Erler Musikverlag
 Oded Zehavi (b. 1961)
     Concerto for viola and orchestra (1994); Israel Music Institute
     Grace (Khesed) for viola and piano (2004)
 Friedrich Zehm (1923–2007)
     Albumblatt (Album Leaf) for viola and piano (1980)
     Drei Elegien (Three Elegies) for viola and piano (1987); Edition Schott
     Duo for violin and viola (1954)
     6 Impromptus for clarinet in A and viola (1987–1988); Edition Ebenos
     Präludium for viola solo (1954)
     Sonata for viola and piano (1949)
 Boris Zeidman – Борис Исаакович Зейдман (1908–1981)
     Concerto No. 1 for viola and orchestra (1938); Muzgiz
     Concerto No. 2 for viola and orchestra (1972); Sovetsky Kompozitor
     Concertino for viola and piano (1962);  (State Music Publishing House)
 Eric Zeisl (1905–1959)
     Arrowhead, Trio for flute, viola and harp (1956); Doblinger Verlag
     Sonata in A minor for viola and piano (1950); Doblinger Verlag
 István Zelenka (1936–2022)
     J'insiste for alto flute, viola and harp (1997)
 Lubomír Železný (1925–1979)
     Concerto for viola and chamber orchestra (1968–1969); Panton
     Koncertantní hudba (Concertant Music) for viola, strings and piano (1969); Panton
 Jan Evangelista Zelinka (1893–1969)
     Fantasie for viola and piano
 Ilja Zeljenka (1932–2007)
     Concerto for viola and wind orchestra
     Sonáta-balada for viola and piano (1988)
     Sonáta-elégia for viola solo (2000)
     Sonatína for viola and piano
     Tri kusy (3 Pieces) for viola solo (1985)
 Carl Friedrich Zelter (1758–1832)
     Concerto in E major for viola and orchestra (1779)
 Pavel Zemek (b. 1957)
     Sonata "Bohuslavu Reynkovi" ("To Bohuslav Reynek") for viola and piano (2003); Český Hudební Fond
 Evgeni Zemtsov – Евгений Николаевич Земцов (1940–2016)
     Melodia im alten Stil (Melody in Old Style) for viola and piano (1968, revised 2010); Guitarmonia, Köln
 Hans Zender (1936–2019)
     Hölderlin lesen II for sprechstimme, viola and live electronics (1987); words by Friedrich Hölderlin; Breitkopf & Härtel
     3 Rondels nach Mallarmé (3 Rondels after Mallarmé) for alto, flute and viola (1966); words by Stéphane Mallarmé; Bote & Bock
 Michal Zenkl (1955–1983)
     Sonata balladica for viola and piano (1978); Český Hudební Fond
 George Zervos – Γιώργος Ζερβός (b. 1947)
     Sonata for viola and piano (1999)
 Zhou Long (b. 1953)
     Wild Grass for viola solo (1993); Oxford University Press
 Gaziza Zhubanova (1927–1993)
     Melody (Мелодия) in C minor for viola and piano (1950); Sovetsky Kompozitor
 Alexander Zhurbin – Александр Борисович Журбин (b. 1945)
     Concerto in Three Movements for viola and orchestra, Op. 31 (1974)
     Sonata for viola and piano, Op. 8
     Три Музы (Three Muses), 3 Pieces for viola, double bass and harpsichord, Op. 46
 Lev Zhurbin (b. 1978)
     25 for viola and piano (2003)
     Dolcissimo for viola and piano (1999)
     Duet for violin and viola (1995)
     Elegia for cello or viola and piano (1995)
     Four for 4 violas (2004)
     Intermezzo Sentimentale for 1 (or 2) violins and viola (2003)
     Kleine Fantasie (Preludia VI) for viola solo (1996)
     Lamentation for 2 cellos or 2 violas (2010)
     N. Maladie for viola and piano (2005)
     No Satisfying Ending for viola and piano (2002)
     Preludia II for viola solo (1994)
     Red Wagon Rag for viola and piano (2002)
     Red Wagon Waltz for viola and piano (2002)
     Romance Funèbre for 2 violas, or violin and viola (2000)
     Shadow and Light for viola and percussion (2012–2013)
     Sugar Hill Bump for 2 violin, viola and string orchestra (2010)
     Three Pieces for viola solo (1997)
     The Vjola Suite for multiple violas (2005–2008)
 Otakar Zich (1879–1934)
     Elegie for viola and piano (1905)
 Lidia Zielińska (b. 1953)
     Glossa for violin or viola solo (1986); Brevis, Poznań
 Grete von Zieritz (1899–2001)
     Kaleidoskop, Duo for violin and viola, Op. 127 (1969); Astoria Verlag
     Sonata for viola and piano, Op. 67 (1939)
     Suite for viola solo, Op. 141 (1976); Astoria Verlag
 Marilyn J. Ziffrin (1926–2018)
     Concerto for viola and woodwind quintet (1977–1978)
     Haiku, Song Cycle for soprano, viola and harpsichord (or piano) (1971); words by Kathryn Martin; Frank E. Warren Music
     Tributum for clarinet, viola and double bass (1992)
 Efrem Zimbalist (1890–1985)
     Sarasateana: Suite of Spanish Dances for viola and piano; 1950s transcription of 4 works by Pablo de Sarasate; original for violin and piano; Alpheus Music; G. Schirmer (The Virtuoso Violist)
 Patrick Zimmerli (b. 1968)
     The Call for viola solo and chamber ensemble (or piano) (2005–2006)
     Spectres for viola solo (2008)
     Trio for flute, viola and harp (2009)
 Alfred Zimmerlin (b. 1955)
     At the Still Point, There the Dance Is for viola solo (2005)
     Langsamer Eingang (Slow Entrance; also known as Gemächlicher Eingang) for viola solo (2000)
     Zwei Winterviolen (Two Winter Violas), Sixteen Stations for 2 violas (2009)
 Bernd Alois Zimmermann (1918–1970)
     Antiphonen for viola and small orchestra (1961); Edition Modern
     Sonata for viola solo (1955); Edition Schott
 Heinz Werner Zimmermann (1930–2022)
     Concerto for viola and orchestra (1980–1986; revised 2006); Edition Gravis
 Gérard Zinsstag (b. 1941)
     Stimuli for viola, cello and double bass (1984); Éditions Musicales Européennes
     Tahir, Fantaisie for viola solo, string orchestra and percussion (1995); Tre Media Musikverlage
 Zinzadze – see Tsintsadze
 Fidelis Zitterbart (1845–1915)
     Aeolian Messengers, 5 Morceaus de salon for viola and piano (1906)
     Barcarolle in A minor for viola and piano
     Barcarolle in C minor for viola and piano (1906)
     Barcarolle in D minor for viola and piano
     Barcarolle in G minor for viola and piano (1896); J. Church
     Barcarolle in G minor for viola and piano (1906)
     Barcarolle No. 2 in G minor for viola and piano
     Barcarolle No. 3 in A minor for viola and piano
     Barcarolle Pathetique in A major for viola and piano
     Barcarolle Sentimentale in D minor for viola and piano (1906)
     Ben Hur (Originale nach Jüdischen Character) in A minor for viola and piano
     Berceuse, Salonstück in F major for viola and piano
     Cavatine in C major for viola and piano
     Evening Reverie in F major for viola and piano
     Hirtengesang in F major for viola and piano
     Idylle in A major for viola and piano (1894)
     Imogen for violin or viola and piano (published 1937); Edward Schuberth
     Introduction et Romanza Appassionato in D major for viola and piano (1905)
     Juliet for violin or viola and piano (published 1937); Edward Schuberth
     Lied ohne Worte (Song without Words) for viola and piano (1896); J. Church
     The Lighthouse, Salonstück in D minor for viola and piano
     Morceaus de Salon (The Voice of a Spring; James' Whistle) for viola and piano (1912)
     Murmering Waves, Morceau de Salon in E major for viola and piano (1906)
     Pastoral Meditation in F major for viola and piano
     Reverie Melancolique in A minor for viola and piano (1903)
     Romance in E major for viola and piano (1905)
     Romanza "La Viol d'amour" in D major for viola and piano (1894)
     Scherzo in F minor for viola and piano
     Serenade ("Italian") in B minor for viola and piano (1903)
     Sonata "Die 300 Jährige" in F major (in 2 movements) for viola and piano (1886); also titled Sonate in F dur No. 2, in 2 Sätzen
     Sonata No. 1 in A minor for viola and piano (1875)
     Sonata No. 2 in G minor for viola and piano (1897); American Viola Society Publications
     Sonata No. 3 in A minor for viola and piano (1900)
     Sonata No. 4 "The Gladiator" in C minor for viola and piano (1903)
     Sonata No. 5 in C minor for viola and piano (1904)
     Sonata No. 6 in E minor for viola and piano (1904)
     Sonata No. 7 in D minor for viola and piano (1905)
     Sonata No. 8 "Panoramic" in E major for viola (or violin) and piano (1905)
     Sonata No. 9 in A minor for viola and piano (1905)
     Sonata No. 11 in C major for viola and piano (1905)
     Sonata No. 12 in B minor for viola and piano (1906)
     Sonata [No. 13] in A major for viola and piano (1910)
     Spanish Serenade for viola and piano (1896); J. Church
     Suite in C major for viola and piano (1911)
     Swansong in G major for viola and piano (1906)
     The Vision of the Spring, Morceau de Salon in E major for viola and piano (1906)
 Đuro Živković (b. 1975)
     Le Cimetière Marin II (The Sea Graveyards II) for viola and chamber ensemble (2009); Edition Octoechos
     Two Sad Songs for soprano, viola and piano (1998)
 Georgi Zlatev-Cherkin – Георги Димитров Златев-Черкин (1905–1977)
     Sevdana (Севдана) for viola and piano (1944); original for violin and piano; transcription by Vadim Borisovsky
 Ashot Zohrabyan (Zograbian) – Ашот Патваканович Зограбян (b. 1945)
     Sonata for viola and piano (1970)
 Yuriy Zolotarenko – Юрій Йосипович Золотаренко (b. 1934)
     Orientale (Орієнталь) for viola and piano (1957); Muzichna Ukraina
     Prelude-Reminiscence (Прелюд-спогад) for viola, string orchestra and oboe (2006)
     Scherzino in Romanian Style (Скерцино в румунському стилі) for viola and string orchestra (2007)
     Sonata for viola and string orchestra (2007)
 Vasily Zolotarev (1872–1964)
     Eclogue (Эклога) in A minor for viola and piano, Op. 38 (1921);  (State Music Publishing House)
 Péter Zombola (b. 1983)
     Institutio No. 5b for viola and string orchestra (2008); original for cello and string orchestra
     Institutio No. 6b for viola and piano (2008); original for cello and piano
     Virág voltam... (Institutio No. 7) for mezzo-soprano, viola and piano (2009); words by Miklós Radnóti
 Paul Martin Zonn (1938–2000) 
     Concerto for viola and 13 instruments (1970); American Composers Alliance
     Sonata for unaccompanied viola (1965); American Composers Alliance
 Moshe Zorman (b. 1952)
     5 Pieces (חמישה קטעים) for violin and viola (1982)
 Juan Carlos Zorzi (1935–1999)
     Adagio for viola and orchestra
     Concerto for viola and string orchestra (1979)
 Zdeněk Zouhar (1927–2011)
     Mamince (To Mother), 3 Songs for baritone and viola (1950, revised 1963)
 Felix Zrno (1890–1981)
     Sonatina for viola and piano
     Suita for viola and piano, Op. 60 (1946)
     Variace na lidovou píseň moravskou (Variations on a Moravian Folk Song) for viola and piano
 Giacomo Zucchi (fl.1800–1828)
     Divertimento in F major for solo viola and string quartet
     Quartetto in F major for solo viola (or flute), violin, viola and cello
     Tema con variazioni (Theme and Variations) in C major for solo viola and string quartet
     Tre serenate (3 Serenades) for solo viola, violin, viola and cello, Op. 3 (1815)
 León Zuckert (1904–1992)
     Short Suite for viola and piano (1974); Canadian Music Centre
     Sisterly Love, Duos for violin and viola (1963); Canadian Music Centre
     Sonata for unaccompanied viola (1984); Canadian Music Centre
     Song in Brass for voice, solo viola, brass, timpani and percussion (1964); Canadian Music Centre
     Tristeza pastoril (Shepherd's Sadness) for viola and harp (1970); Canadian Music Centre
 Robert Zuidam (b. 1964)
     Music for viola, piano and ensemble (2004); Albersen Verhuur
 Menachem Zur – מנחם צור (b. 1942)
     Cadenza for viola solo (1997); Israeli Music Institute
     Concerto da camera for viola and ensemble (1997); Israeli Music Center
     Concerto Grosso for violin, viola, cello and chamber orchestra (1992); Israel Music Institute
     Discussions II for bassoon and viola (1979); Seesaw Music
     Prelude for viola solo (1992); Israel Music Institute
 Wim Zwaag (b. 1960)
     Adagio for viola and piano (2005); Elements Edition
     Concerto for viola and orchestra (2015)
     Trio for violin, viola and piano (2011)
 Samuel Zyman (b. 1956)
     Sonata for viola and piano (1992); composer's transcription of his Cello Sonata; Merion Music; Theodore Presser Company

References

External links
 Free scores featuring the viola at the International Music Score Library Project

 
Viola T-Z